= Spherical tokamak =

Fusion power device

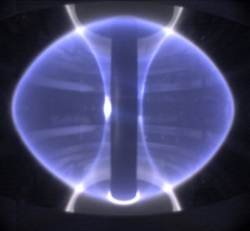
A plasma in the MAST reactor. Note the almost spherical shape of the outside edge of the plasma. The high elongation is also evident, notably the filaments extending off the top and bottom near the central conductor.

A spherical tokamak is a type of fusion power device based on the tokamak principle. It is notable for its very narrow profile, or aspect ratio. A traditional tokamak has a toroidal confinement area that gives it an overall shape similar to a donut, complete with a large hole in the middle. The spherical tokamak reduces the size of the hole as much as possible, resulting in a plasma shape that is almost spherical, often compared to a cored apple. The spherical tokamak is sometimes referred to as a spherical torus and often shortened to ST.

The spherical tokamak is an offshoot of the conventional tokamak design. Proponents claim that it has a number of substantial practical advantages over these devices. For this reason the ST has generated considerable interest since the late 1980s. However, development remains effectively one generation behind traditional tokamak efforts like JET. Major experiments in the ST field include the pioneering START and MAST at Culham in the UK, the US's National Spherical Torus Experiment - Upgrade (NSTX-U) and Russian Globus-M.

Research has investigated whether spherical tokamaks are a route to lower cost reactors. Further research is needed to better understand how such devices scale. Even in the event that STs do not lead to lower cost approaches to power generation, they are still lower cost in general; this makes them attractive devices for studying plasma physics, or as high-energy neutron sources.

Princeton Plasma Physics Laboratory cites three advantages. First, spherical tokamaks require less steel, concrete, and copper are needed for construction, which should make them cheaper to build than larger conventional tokamaks. Second, their geometry lets the magnetic field lines confine and stabilize the plasma more efficiently even with weaker magnets. Third, the spherical design allows plasma particles to spin faster, which helps break up small turbulent ripples that would otherwise leak heat out.

== Background ==
=== Basic fusion physics ===
The basic idea behind fusion is to force two suitable atoms close enough together that the strong force pulls them together to make a single larger atom. This process releases a considerable amount of binding energy, typically in the form of high-speed subatomic particles like neutrons or beta particles. However, these same fuel atoms also experience the electromagnetic force pushing them apart. In order for them to fuse, they must be pressed together with enough energy to overcome this Coulomb barrier.

The simplest way to do this is to heat the fuel to very high temperatures, and allow the Maxwell–Boltzmann distribution to produce a number of very high-energy atoms within a larger, cooler mix. For the fusion to occur, the higher speed atoms have to meet, and in the random distribution that will take time. The time will be reduced by increasing the temperature, which increases the number of high-speed particles in the mix, or by increasing the pressure, which keeps them closer together. The product of temperature, pressure and time produces the expected rate of fusion events, the so-called fusion triple product. To be useful as a net energy exporter, the triple product has to meet a certain minimum condition, the Lawson criterion.

In practical terms, the required temperatures are on the order of 100 million degrees. This leads to problems with the two other terms; confining the fuel at a high enough pressure and for a long enough time is well beyond the capabilities of any known material. However, at these temperatures the fuel is in the form of an electrically conductive plasma, which leads to a number of potential confinement solutions using magnetic or electrical fields. Most fusion devices use variations of these techniques.

Tokamaks are the most researched approach within the larger group of magnetic fusion energy (MFE) designs. They attempt to confine a plasma using powerful magnetic fields. Tokamaks confine their fuel at low pressure (around 1/millionth of atmospheric) but high temperatures (150 million Celsius), and attempt to keep those conditions stable for ever-increasing times on the order of seconds to minutes. (Note: Many advanced tokamak designs routinely hit numbers on the order of ~ 1 × 10^{21} keV • seconds / m^{3}.) Doing so, however, requires massive amount of power in the magnetic system, and any way to reduce this improves the overall energy efficiency of the system.

=== Energy balance ===
Ideally, the energy needed to heat the fuel would be made up by the energy released from the reactions, keeping the cycle going. Anything over and above this amount could be used for power generation. This leads to the concept of the Lawson criterion, which delineates the conditions needed to produce net power.

When the fusion fuel is heated, it will naturally lose energy through a number of processes. These are generally related to radiating terms like blackbody radiation, and conduction terms, where the physical interaction with the surroundings carries energy out of the plasma. The resulting energy balance for any fusion power device, using a hot plasma, is shown below.

$$P_\text{net} = \eta_\text{capture}\left(P_\text{fusion} - P_\text{conduction} - P_\text{radiation}\right)$$

where:

- $P_\text{net}$, is the net power out
- $\eta_\text{capture}$, is the efficiency with which the plant captures energy, say through a steam turbine, and any power used to run the reactor
- $P_\text{fusion}$, is the power generated by fusion reactions, basically a function of the rate of reactions
- $P_\text{conduction}$, is the power lost through conduction to the reactor body
- $P_\text{radiation}$, is the power lost as light, leaving the plasma, typically through gamma radiation

To achieve net power, a device must be built which optimizes this equation. Fusion research has traditionally focused on increasing the first P term: the fusion rate. This has led to a variety of machines that operate at ever higher temperatures and attempt to maintain the resulting plasma in a stable state long enough to meet the desired triple product. However, it is also essential to maximize the η for practical reasons, and in the case of a MFE reactor, that generally means increasing the efficiency of the confinement system, notably the energy used in the magnets.

=== Beta number ===
A measure of success across the magnetic fusion energy world is the beta number. Every machine containing plasma magnetically, can be compared using this number.

$\beta = \frac{p}{p_{mag}} = \frac{n k_B T}{(B^2/2\mu_0)}$

This is the ratio of the plasma pressure to the magnetic field pressure. Improving beta means that you need to use, in relative terms, less energy to generate the magnetic fields for any given plasma pressure (or density). The price of magnets scales roughly with β^{1/2}, so reactors operating at higher betas are less expensive for any given level of confinement. Conventional tokamaks operate at relatively low betas, the record being just over 12%, but various calculations show that practical designs would need to operate as high as 20%.

=== Aspect ratio ===
One limiting factor in improving beta is the size of the magnets. Tokamaks use a series of ring-shaped magnets around the confinement area, and their physical dimensions mean that the hole in the middle of the torus can be reduced only so much before the magnet windings are touching. This limits the aspect ratio, $A = R/a$, of the reactor to about 2.5; the diameter of the reactor as a whole could be about 2.5 times the cross-sectional diameter of the confinement area. Some experimental designs were slightly under this limit, while many reactors had much higher A.

== History ==
=== Reducing aspect ratio ===
During the 1980s, researchers at Oak Ridge National Laboratory (ORNL), led by Ben Carreras and Tim Hender, were studying the operations of tokamaks as A was reduced. They noticed, based on magnetohydrodynamic considerations, that tokamaks were inherently more stable at low aspect ratios. In particular, the classic "kink instability" was strongly suppressed. Other groups expanded on this body of theory, and found that the same was true for the high-order ballooning instability as well. This suggested that a low-A machine would not only be less expensive to build, but have better performance as well.

In the traditional tokamak design, the confinement magnets are normally arranged outside a toroidal vacuum chamber holding the plasma. This chamber is known as the first wall, and defines the minimum distance between the magnets and plasma. In a production design, another layer, the blanket, sits between the first wall and magnets. The blanket serves two purposes, one is to protect the magnets from the high energy neutrons, which will damage them, and the other is to use those neutrons to breed tritium from lithium, producing more fuel for the reactor. However, this arrangement means there is considerable distance between the magnets and plasma, in most designs something on the order of a meter or more. This places significant limits on the achievable aspect ratio.

One attempt to improve the reactor geometry was attempted by a class of designs known as the "compact tokamak", typified by the Alcator C-Mod (operational since 1991), the Riggatron (conceptual, unbuilt) and IGNITOR (construction abandoned). The later two of these designs dispensed with the first wall and placed the magnets in direct contact with the plasma; in a production design the blanket would be outside the magnets. This greatly simplifies the physical design as well, as the toroidal vacuum vessel can be replaced with a cylinder. The decreased distance between the magnets and plasma leads to much higher betas, so conventional (non-superconducting) magnets could be used. The downside to this approach, one that was widely criticized in the field, is that it places the magnets directly in the high-energy neutron flux of the fusion reactions. In operation the magnets would be rapidly eroded, requiring the vacuum vessel to be opened and the entire magnet assembly replaced after a month or so of operation.

Around the same time, several advances in plasma physics were making their way through the fusion community. Of particular importance were the concepts of elongation and triangularity, referring to the cross-sectional shape of the plasma. Early tokamaks had all used circular cross-sections simply because that was the easiest to model and build, but over time it became clear that C or (more commonly) D-shaped plasma cross-sections led to higher performance. This produces plasmas with high "shear", which distributed and broke up turbulent eddies in the plasma. These changes led to the "advanced tokamak" designs, which include ITER.

=== Spherical tokamaks ===
In 1984, Martin Peng of ORNL proposed an alternate arrangement of the magnet coils that would greatly reduce the aspect ratio while avoiding the erosion issues of the compact tokamak. Instead of wiring each magnet coil separately, he proposed using a single large conductor in the center, and wiring the magnets as half-rings off of this conductor. What was once a series of individual rings passing through the hole in the center of the reactor was reduced to a single post, allowing for aspect ratios as low as 1.2. This means that STs can reach the same operational triple product numbers as conventional designs using one tenth the magnetic field.

The design, naturally, also included the advances in plasma shaping that were being studied concurrently. Like all modern designs, the ST uses a D-shaped plasma cross section. If you consider a D on the right side and a reversed D on the left, as the two approach each other (as A is reduced) eventually the vertical surfaces touch and the resulting shape is a circle. In 3D, the outer surface is roughly spherical. They named this layout the "spherical tokamak", or ST. These studies suggested that the ST layout would include all the qualities of the advanced tokamak, the compact tokamak, would strongly suppress several forms of turbulence, reach high β, have high self-magnetization and be less costly to build.

The ST concept appeared to represent an enormous advance in tokamak design. In 1985 ORNL proposed the Spherical Torus Experiment (STX). However, this was during a period when US fusion research budgets were being dramatically scaled back. ORNL was provided with funds to develop and test a prototype central solenoid column built with 6 layers of turns of a high-strength copper alloy called "Glidcop" (each layer with water cooling). However, they were unable to secure funding to build the complete STX design.

=== From spheromak to ST ===
Failing to build an ST at ORNL, Peng began a worldwide effort to interest other teams in the ST concept and get a test machine built. One way to do this quickly would be to convert a spheromak machine to the ST layout.

Spheromaks are essentially "smoke rings" of plasma that are internally self-stable. Typical reactors use gas puffers and magnets to form the spheromak and inject it into a cylindrical confinement area, but as the magnetic fields are confined within the plasma, they are free to drift about the confinement area and collide with the first wall. The typical solution to this problem was to wrap the area in a sheet of copper, or more rarely, place a copper conductor down the center. When the spheromak approaches the conductor, a magnetic field is generated that pushes it away again. A number of experimental spheromak machines were built in the 1970s and early 80s, but demonstrated performance that simply was not interesting enough to suggest further development.

Spheromaks with the central conductor had a strong mechanical resemblance to the ST design, and could be converted with relative ease. The first such conversion was made to the Heidelberg Spheromak Experiment or HSE. Built at Heidelberg University in the early 1980s, HSE was quickly converted to a ST in 1987 by adjusting its magnetic coils at the outside of the confinement area and attaching them to a new central conductor. Although the new configuration only operated "cold", far below fusion temperatures, the results were promising and demonstrated all of the basic features of the ST.

Several other groups with spheromak machines made similar conversions, notably the rotamak at the Australian Nuclear Science and Technology Organisation and the SPHEX machine. In general they all found an increase in performance of a factor of two or more. This was an enormous advance, and the need for a purpose-built machine became pressing.

=== START ===
Peng's advocacy also caught the interest of Derek Robinson, of the United Kingdom Atomic Energy Authority (UKAEA) fusion center at Culham. What became known as the Culham Centre for Fusion Energy was set up in the 1960s to centralize UK fusion research, then spread across several sites. Robinson had recently been promoted to running several projects at the site.

Robinson assembled a team and secure funding on the order of 100,000 pounds to build an experimental machine, the Small Tight Aspect Ratio Tokamak, or START. Parts of the machine were recycled from earlier projects, while others were loaned from other labs, including a 40 keV neutral beam injector from ORNL. Before it started operation considerable uncertainty attended its performance.

Construction began in 1990. It was assembled rapidly and started operation in January 1991. Its earliest operations ended theoretical concerns. Using ohmic heating alone, START demonstrated betas as high as 12%, almost matching the record of 12.6% on the DIII-D machine. The results were good enough that an additional 10 million pounds of funding was provided, funding a major re-build in 1995. When neutral beam heating was turned on, beta jumped to 40%, beating conventional designs by 3x.

Additionally, START demonstrated excellent plasma stability. A practical rule of thumb in conventional designs is that as the operational beta approaches a value normalized for the machine size, ballooning instability destabilizes the plasma. This so-called "Troyon limit" is normally 4, and generally limited to about 3.5 in real world machines. START increased this limit to 6. The limit depends on machine size, and indicates that machines will have to be built of at least a certain size to reach performance goals. With START's much higher scaling, the same limits would be reached with a smaller machine.

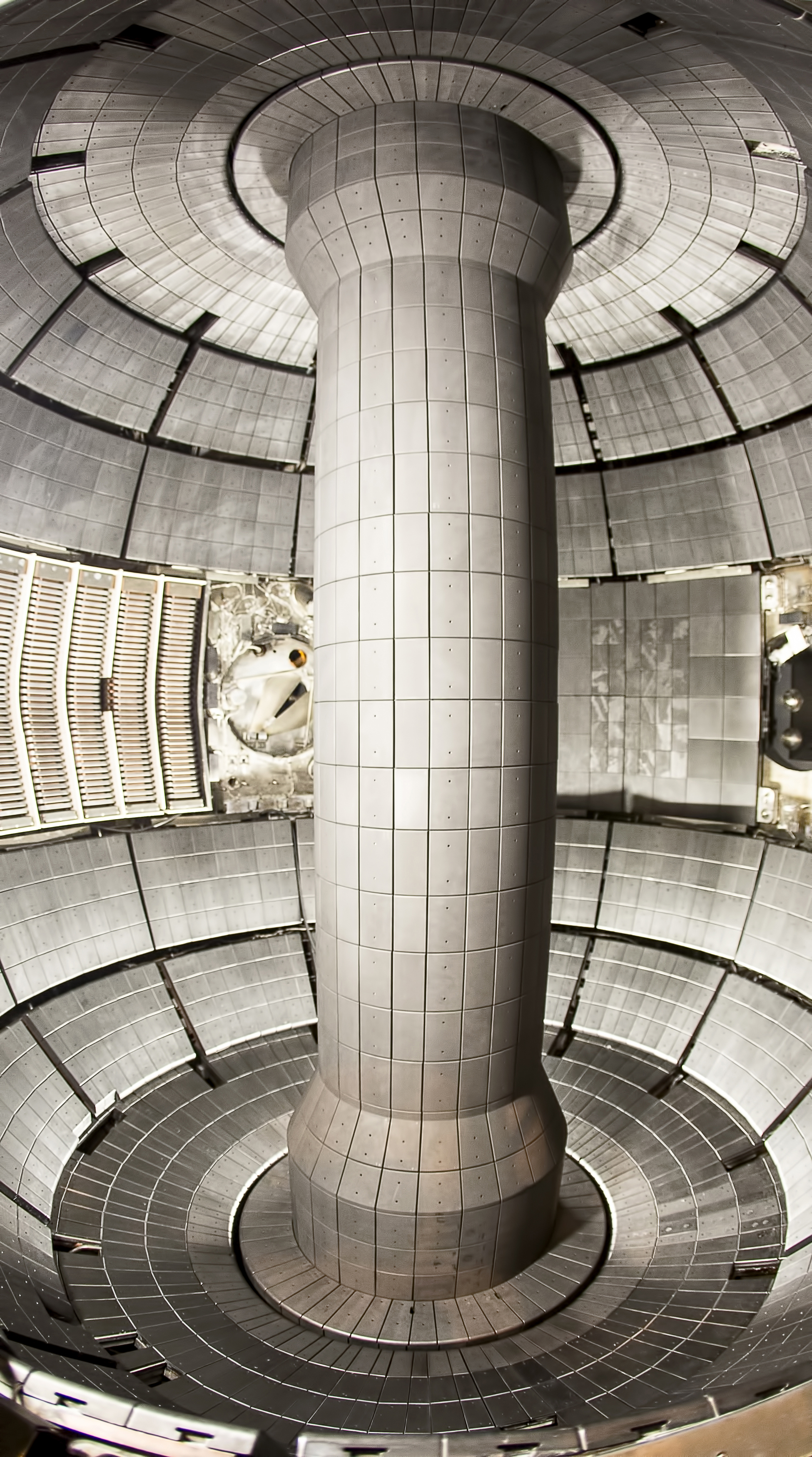
Inside the National Spherical Torus Experiment vacuum chamber.

START demonstrated Peng and Strickler's predictions; ST had performance an order of magnitude better than conventional designs, and cost much less to build.

ST represented a new, lower cost approach. It was one of the few areas of mainline fusion research where contributions could be made on small budgets.

=== Later projects ===
ST projects started around the world. In particular, the National Spherical Torus Experiment (NSTX) and Pegasus experiments in the US, Globus-M in Russia, and the UK's follow-on to START, MAST.

Meanwhile START found new life as part of the revolutionary Proto-Sphera project in Italy, where experimenters attempted to eliminate the central column by passing the current through a secondary plasma. The Proto-Sphera project also removes the need of a divertor, since plasma instabilities are exploited rather than avoided.

NSTX-U is currently under construction, with

== Design ==
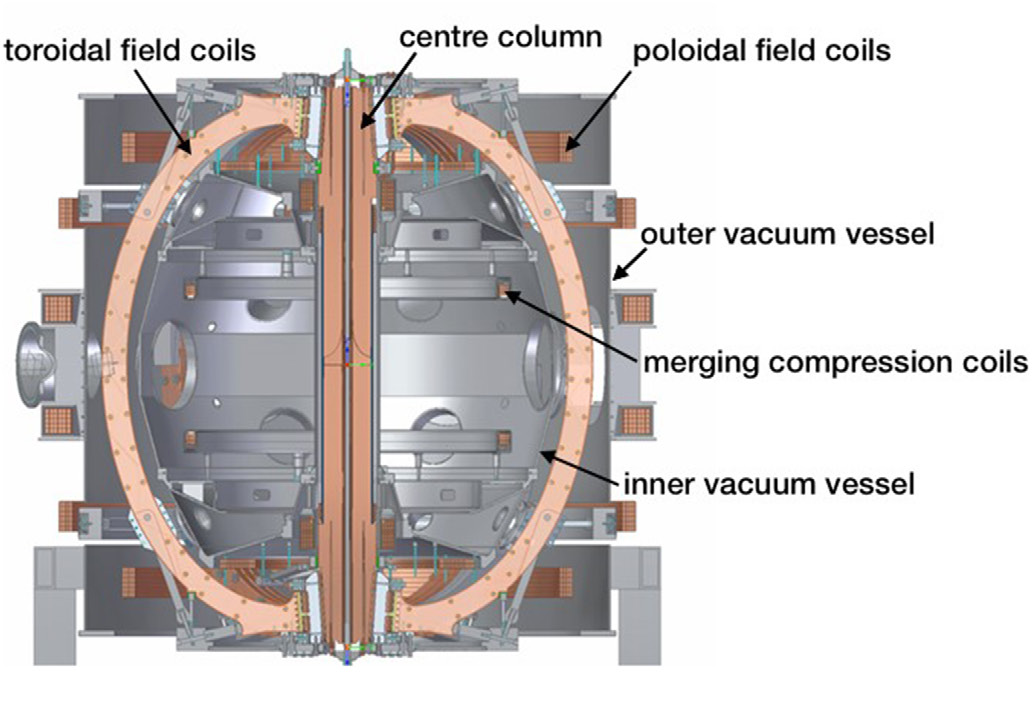
Design of the ST40 spherical tokamak with a major radius of 0.4 m.

Tokamak reactors consist of a toroidal vacuum tube surrounded by a series of magnets. One set of magnets is logically wired in a series of rings around the outside of the tube, but are physically connected through a common conductor in the center. The central column is also normally used to house the solenoid that forms the inductive loop for the ohmic heating system (and pinch current).

The canonical example of the design can be seen in the small tabletop ST device made at Flinders University, which uses a central column made of copper wire wound into a solenoid, return bars for the toroidal field made of vertical copper wires, and a metal ring connecting the two and providing mechanical support to the structure.

=== Stability ===
Advances in plasma physics in the 1970s and 80s led to a much stronger understanding of stability issues, and this developed into a series of "scaling laws" that can be used to quickly determine rough operational numbers across a wide variety of systems. In particular, Troyon's work on the critical beta of a reactor design is considered one of the great advances in modern plasma physics. Troyon's work provides a beta limit where operational reactors will start to see significant instabilities, and demonstrates how this limit scales with size, layout, magnetic field and current in the plasma.

However, Troyon's work did not consider extreme aspect ratios, work that was later carried out by a group at the Princeton Plasma Physics Laboratory. This starts with a development of a useful beta for a highly asymmetric volume:

$$\beta=\frac{\mu_{0}p}{\langle B^2\rangle}.$$

Where $\langle B^2\rangle$ is the volume averaged magnetic field $\scriptstyle\langle B^2\rangle = \langle B_{\theta}^2 + B_{\rho}^2\rangle$ (as opposed to Troyon's use of the field in the vacuum outside the plasma, $\scriptstyle B_0$). Following Freidberg, this beta is then fed into a modified version of the safety factor:

$$q_\star= \frac{2\pi B_0 a^2}{\mu_0 R_0 I} \left( \frac{1+\kappa^2}{2} \right).$$

Where $\scriptstyle B_0$ is the vacuum magnetic field, a is the minor radius, $\scriptstyle R$ the major radius, $\scriptstyle I$ the plasma current, and $\scriptstyle \kappa$ the elongation. In this definition it should be clear that decreasing aspect ratio, $\scriptstyle R/a,$ leads to higher average safety factors. These definitions allowed the Princeton group to develop a more flexible version of Troyon's critical beta:

$$\beta_\text{crit} = 5\langle B_N\rangle \left( \frac{1+\kappa^2}{2}\right) \frac{\epsilon}{q_\star}.$$

Where $\epsilon$ is the inverse aspect ratio $1/A$ and $\langle B_N\rangle$ is a constant scaling factor that is about 0.03 for any $q_\star$ greater than 2. Note that the critical beta scales with aspect ratio, although not directly, because $q_\star$ also includes aspect ratio factors. Numerically, it can be shown that $\beta_\text{crit}$ is maximized for:

$$q_\star = 1 + \left(\frac{3}{4}\right)^{4/5} \approx 1.8.$$

Using this in the critical beta formula above:

$$\beta_\text{max} = 0.072 \left(\frac{1+\kappa^2}{2}\right)\epsilon.$$

For a spherical tokamak with an elongation $\kappa$ of 2 and an aspect ratio of 1.25:

$$\beta_\text{max} = 0.072 \left(\frac{1+2^2}{2}\right)\frac{1}{1.25} = 0.14.$$

Now compare this to a traditional tokamak with the same elongation and a major radius of 5 meters and minor radius of 2 meters:

$$\beta_\text{max} = 0.072 \left(\frac{1+2^2}{2}\right)\frac{1}{5/2} = 0.072.$$

The linearity of $\beta_\text{max}\,$ with aspect ratio is evident.

=== Power scaling ===
Beta is an important measure of performance, but in the case of a reactor designed to produce electricity, there are other practical issues that have to be considered. Among these is the power density, which offers an estimate of the size of the machine needed for a given power output. This is, in turn, a function of the plasma pressure, which is in turn a function of beta. At first glance it might seem that the ST's higher betas would naturally lead to higher allowable pressures, and thus higher power density. However, this is only true if the magnetic field remains the same – beta is the ratio of magnetic to plasma density.

If one imagines a toroidal confinement area wrapped with ring-shaped magnets, it is clear that the magnetic field is greater on the inside radius than the outside - this is the basic stability problem that the tokamak's electric current addresses. However, the difference in that field is a function of aspect ratio; an infinitely large toroid would approximate a straight solenoid, while an ST maximizes the difference in field strength. Moreover, as there are certain aspects of reactor design that are fixed in size, the aspect ratio might be forced into certain configurations. For instance, production reactors would use a thick "blanket" containing lithium around the reactor core in order to capture the high-energy neutrons being released, both to protect the rest of the reactor mass from these neutrons as well as produce tritium for fuel. The size of the blanket is a function of the neutron's energy, which is 14 MeV in the D-T reaction regardless of the reactor design, Thus the blanket would be the same for a ST or traditional design, about a meter across.

In this case further consideration of the overall magnetic field is needed when considering the betas. Working inward through the reactor volume toward the inner surface of the plasma we would encounter the blanket, "first wall" and several empty spaces. As we move away from the magnet, the field reduces in a roughly linear fashion. If we consider these reactor components as a group, we can calculate the magnetic field that remains on the far side of the blanket, at the inner face of the plasma:

$$B_{0}= ({1 - \epsilon_B - \epsilon}) {B_\text{max}}.\,$$

Now we consider the average plasma pressure that can be generated with this magnetic field. Following Freidberg:

$${\langle p \rangle} = \beta_\text{max}\left (1 + \kappa^2\right) \epsilon
\left({1 - \epsilon_B - \epsilon}\right)^2 G(\epsilon) \left(B_\text{max}\right)^2.$$

In an ST, where we are attempting to maximize $B_0$ as a general principle, one can eliminate the blanket on the inside face and leave the central column open to the neutrons. In this case, $\epsilon_0$ is zero. Considering a central column made of copper, we can fix the maximum field generated in the coil, $B_\text{max}$ to about 7.5 T. Using the ideal numbers from the section above:

$${\langle p \rangle} = 0.14 \left(1 + 2^2\right)  \left(\frac{1}{1.25}\right)
\left(1 - \frac{1}{1.25}\right)^2  2.5 \cdot 7.5^2  = 2.6 \text{ atmospheres}.$$

Now consider the conventional design as above, using superconducting magnets with a $B_\text{max}$ of 15 T, and a blanket of 1.2 meters thickness. First we calculate $\epsilon$ to be 1/(5/2) = 0.4 and $\epsilon_b$ to be 1.5/5 = 0.24, then:

$${\langle p \rangle} = 0.072  \left(1 + 2^2\right)  \left(\frac{1}{0.4}\right)  \left(1 - \frac{1}{0.24} - \frac{1}{0.4}\right)^2  1.2 \cdot 15^2 = 7.7 \text{ atmospheres}.$$

So in spite of the higher beta in the ST, the overall power density is lower, largely due to the use of superconducting magnets in the traditional design. This issue has led to considerable work to see if these scaling laws hold for the ST, and efforts to increase the allowable field strength through a variety of methods. Work on START suggests that the scaling factors are much higher in STs, but this work needs to be replicated at higher powers to better understand the scaling. Research using data from NSTX and MAST appears to confirm the supposition that for similar values of field and fusion power, but smaller volume, STs can demonstrate a fusion triple product of up to a factor of three higher and a fusion power gain of an order of magnitude higher than tokamaks.

=== Advantages ===
STs have two major advantages over conventional designs.

The first is practical. Using the ST layout places the toroidal magnets much closer to the plasma, on average. This greatly reduces the amount of energy needed to power the magnets in order to reach any particular level of magnetic field within the plasma. Smaller magnets cost less, reducing the cost of the reactor. The gains are so great that superconducting magnets may not be required, leading to even greater cost reductions. START placed the secondary magnets inside the vacuum chamber, but in modern machines these have been moved outside and can be superconducting.

The other advantages have to do with the stability of the plasma. Since the earliest days of fusion research, the problem in making a useful system has been a number of plasma instabilities that only appeared as the operating conditions moved ever closer to useful ones for fusion power. In 1954 Edward Teller hosted a meeting exploring some of these issues, and noted that he felt plasmas would be inherently more stable if they were following convex lines of magnetic force, rather than concave. It was not clear at the time if this manifested itself in the real world, but over time the wisdom of these words became apparent.

In the tokamak, stellarator and most pinch devices, the plasma is forced to follow helical magnetic lines. This alternately moves the plasma from the outside of the confinement area to the inside. While on the outside, the particles are being pushed inward, following a concave line. As they move to the inside they are being pushed outward, following a convex line. Thus, following Teller's reasoning, the plasma is inherently more stable on the inside section of the reactor. In practice the actual limits are suggested by the "safety factor", q, which vary over the volume of the plasma.

In a traditional circular cross-section tokamak, the plasma spends about the same time on the inside and the outside of the torus; slightly less on the inside because of the shorter radius. In the advanced tokamak with a D-shaped plasma, the inside surface of the plasma is significantly enlarged and the particles spend more time there. However, in a normal high-A design, q varies only slightly as the particle moves about, as the relative distance from inside the outside is small compared to the radius of the machine as a whole (the definition of aspect ratio). In an ST machine, the variance from "inside" to "outside" is much larger in relative terms, and the particles spend much more of their time on the "inside". This leads to greatly improved stability.

It is possible to build a traditional tokamak that operates at higher betas, through the use of more powerful magnets. To do this, the current in the plasma must be increased in order to generate the toroidal magnetic field of the right magnitude. This drives the plasma ever closer to the Troyon limits where instabilities set in. The ST design, through its mechanical arrangement, has much better q and thus allows for much more magnetic power before the instabilities appear. Conventional designs hit the Troyon limit around 3.5, whereas START demonstrated operation at 6.

=== Disadvantages ===
The ST has three distinct disadvantages compared to "conventional" advanced tokamaks with higher aspect ratios.

The first issue is that the overall pressure of the plasma in an ST is lower than conventional designs, in spite of higher beta. This is due to the limits of the magnetic field on the inside of the plasma, $B_\text{max}.$ This limit is theoretically the same in the ST and conventional designs, but as the ST has a much lower aspect ratio, the effective field changes more dramatically over the plasma volume.

The second issue is both an advantage and disadvantage. The ST is so small, at least in the center, that there is little or no room for superconducting magnets. This is not a deal-breaker for the design, as the field from conventional copper wound magnets is enough for the ST design. However, this means that power dissipation in the central column will be considerable. Engineering studies suggest that the maximum field possible will be about 7.5 T, much lower than is possible with a conventional layout. This places a further limit on the allowable plasma pressures. However, the lack of superconducting magnets greatly lowers the price of the system, potentially offsetting this issue economically.

The lack of shielding also means the magnet is directly exposed to the interior of the reactor. It is subject to the full heating flux of the plasma, and the neutrons generated by the fusion reactions. In practice, this means that the column would have to be replaced fairly often, likely on the order of a year, greatly affecting the availability of the reactor. In production settings, the availability is directly related to the cost of electrical production. Experiments are underway to see if the conductor can be replaced by a z-pinch plasma or liquid metal conductor in its place.

Finally, the highly asymmetrical plasma cross sections and tightly wound magnetic fields require very high toroidal currents to maintain them. Normally this would require large amounts of secondary heating systems, like neutral beam injection. These are energetically expensive, so the ST design relies on high bootstrap currents for economical operation. Luckily, high elongation and triangularity are the features that give rise to these currents, so it is possible that the ST will actually be more economical in this regard. This is an area of active research.

== List of ST machines ==
=== Retired ===
- Small Tight Aspect Ratio Tokamak (START), UK. Hardware used for Proto-Sphera, Italy

=== Operational ===
- ST25 website, Tokamak Energy, UK
- Mega Ampere Spherical Tokamak, MAST website, Culham Centre for Fusion Energy, United Kingdom
- Globus-M website, Ioffe Institute, Russia
- NSTX, NSTX website, Princeton Plasma Physics Laboratory, United States
- Proto-Sphera website (using hardware from START), ENEA, Italy
- TST-2, University of Tokyo, Japan
- QUEST, Kyushu University, Japan
- SUNIST, Tsinghua University, China
- PEGASUS, PEGASUS website, University of Wisconsin–Madison, United States
- ETE website, National Institute for Space Research, Brazil

=== Under construction ===
- URANIA upgrade from Pegasus

=== Proposed ===
- Spherical Tokamak for Energy Production (STEP), UK
