= Culham Centre for Fusion Energy =

UK's national laboratory for controlled fusion research

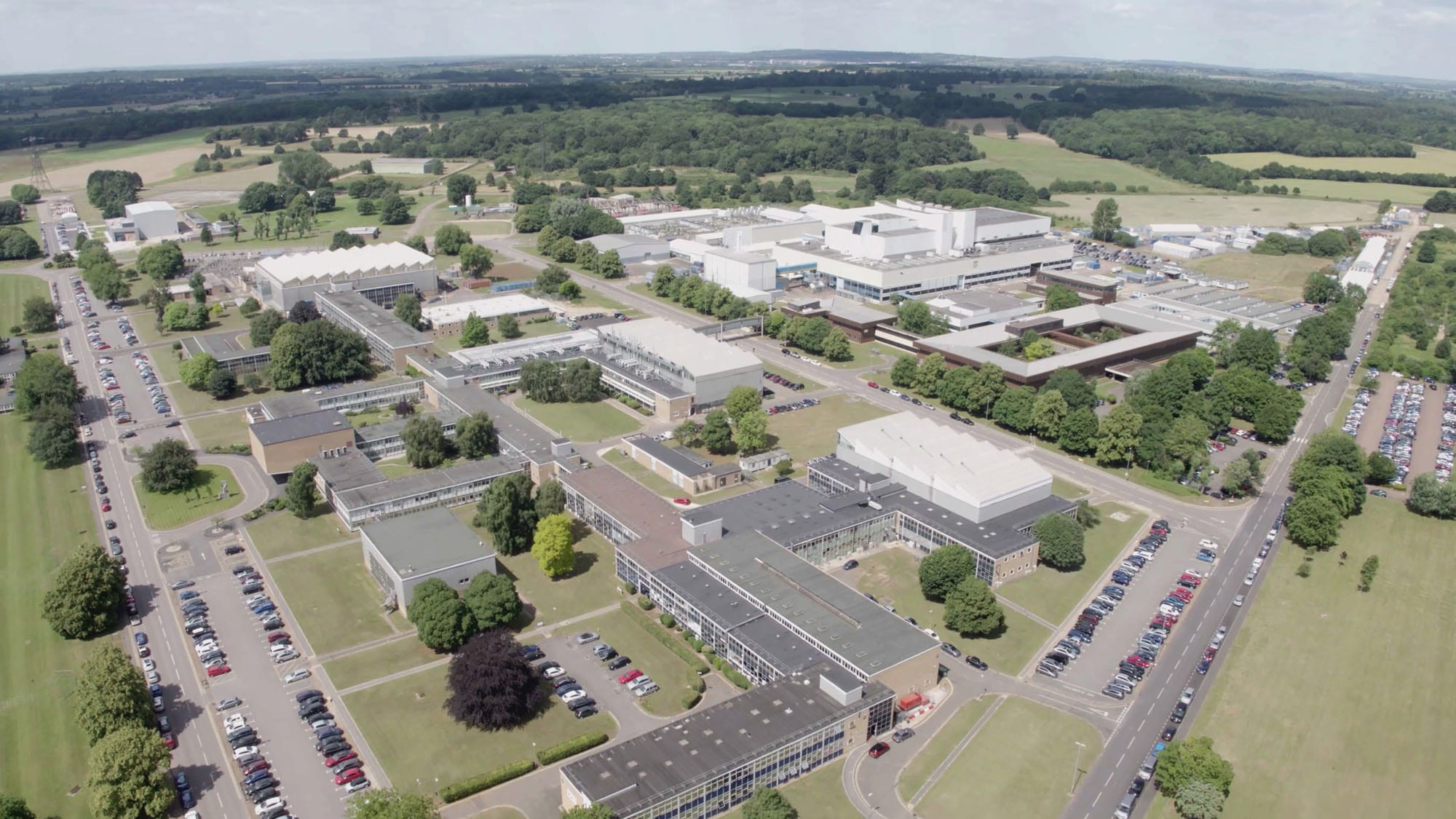
- Aerial view of Culham Centre for Fusion Energy
- Established: 1965
- Laboratory type: National scientific research laboratory
- Field of research: Applied science; Nuclear fusion
- Director: Dennis Whyte
- Staff: 2,200
- Location: Culham, Oxfordshire, England; 51°39′32″N 1°13′42″W
- Operating agency: United Kingdom Atomic Energy Authority
- Website: ccfe.ukaea.uk

Map
- Location within Oxfordshire

UKAEA Culham Campus, formerly known as the Culham Centre for Fusion Energy (CCFE), is one of the UK's national laboratories for fusion research. It is located at the Culham Campus, a science business park in Oxfordshire. It has been the site of the Joint European Torus, a multinational tokamak project that has held the world record for fusion power production since 1997. It is currently the site of the UK's flagship operational fusion experiment, the Mega Ampere Spherical Tokamak (MAST). It participates in the UK's Spherical Tokamak for Energy Production (STEP) fusion power plant project, which will be located at a different site.

It occupies the site of the former Royal Navy airfield RNAS Culham (HMS Hornbill), which was transferred to UKAEA in 1960. The UKAEA continues to operate the site and is the major tenant. As well as fusion laboratories it also houses the headquarters of the UKAEA, and since the 2001 foundation of the Culham Innovation Centre (now Culham Campus) it hosts other non-profit and commercial organisations relating to research and technology, including the former Reaction Engines.

== History ==
=== Pinch and stellarator experiments, 1965 - 1977 ===
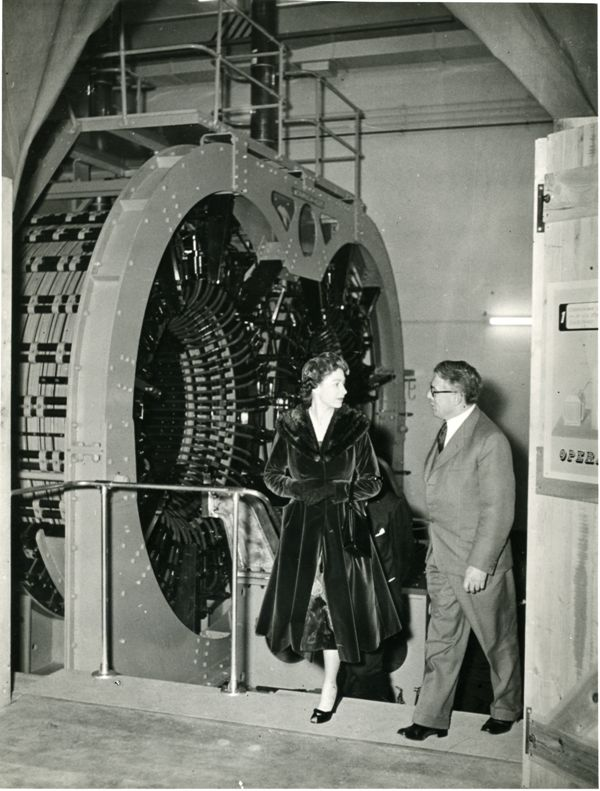
Queen Elizabeth II inspects ZETA at Harwell.

UKAEA officially opened Culham Laboratory in 1965. Following the apparent success of the ZETA magnetic pinch-based fusion machine at the nearby Harwell research site, a successor was planned. This machine, the Intermediate-Current Stability Experiment (ICSE), would be larger and not suitable for the Harwell site, so RNAS Culham was purchased and repurposed as a fusion laboratory.

Ultimately ICSE was cancelled. It had been realised that ZETA's performance had been misinterpreted as better than actual, and theory calculations had also brought the device type's stability into question. Culham nonetheless amalgamated fusion activities at Aldermaston and other UK locations to form a national centre for fusion research.

With ICSE cancelled, Culham no longer had its founding mission. ZETA itself remained at Harwell. Culham's early focus thus became the stellarator, which was the most prominent magnetic fusion machine type in the USA at that time. The first Culham stellarator was CLASP (Closed Line And Single Particle), which proved that stellarator magnetic fields could contain single particles, concluding "extreme accuracy in construction is probably not required." This result overcame some important objections to the stellarator type following poor performance of the Princeton Model C stellarator in the USA. Culham confirmed its experimental result with computer calculations of the stellarator magnetic field in the late 1960s. CLASP was followed by the Proto-CLEO and CLEO stellarators.

Culham built almost 30 different experiments in its first two decades as a variety of fusion concepts were tried out; among them shock-waves, magnetic mirror machines, stellarators and levitrons. During the 1970s, research became focused on magnetic confinement fusion using the tokamak device, which had emerged as the most promising design for a future fusion reactor. In the late 1960s, Culham scientists had already assisted in tokamak development by using laser scattering measurement techniques to verify the highly promising results achieved by the Soviet T-3 tokamak. This led to the adoption of the tokamak by the majority of fusion research establishments internationally.

=== Tokamaks and JET, 1977-2023 ===
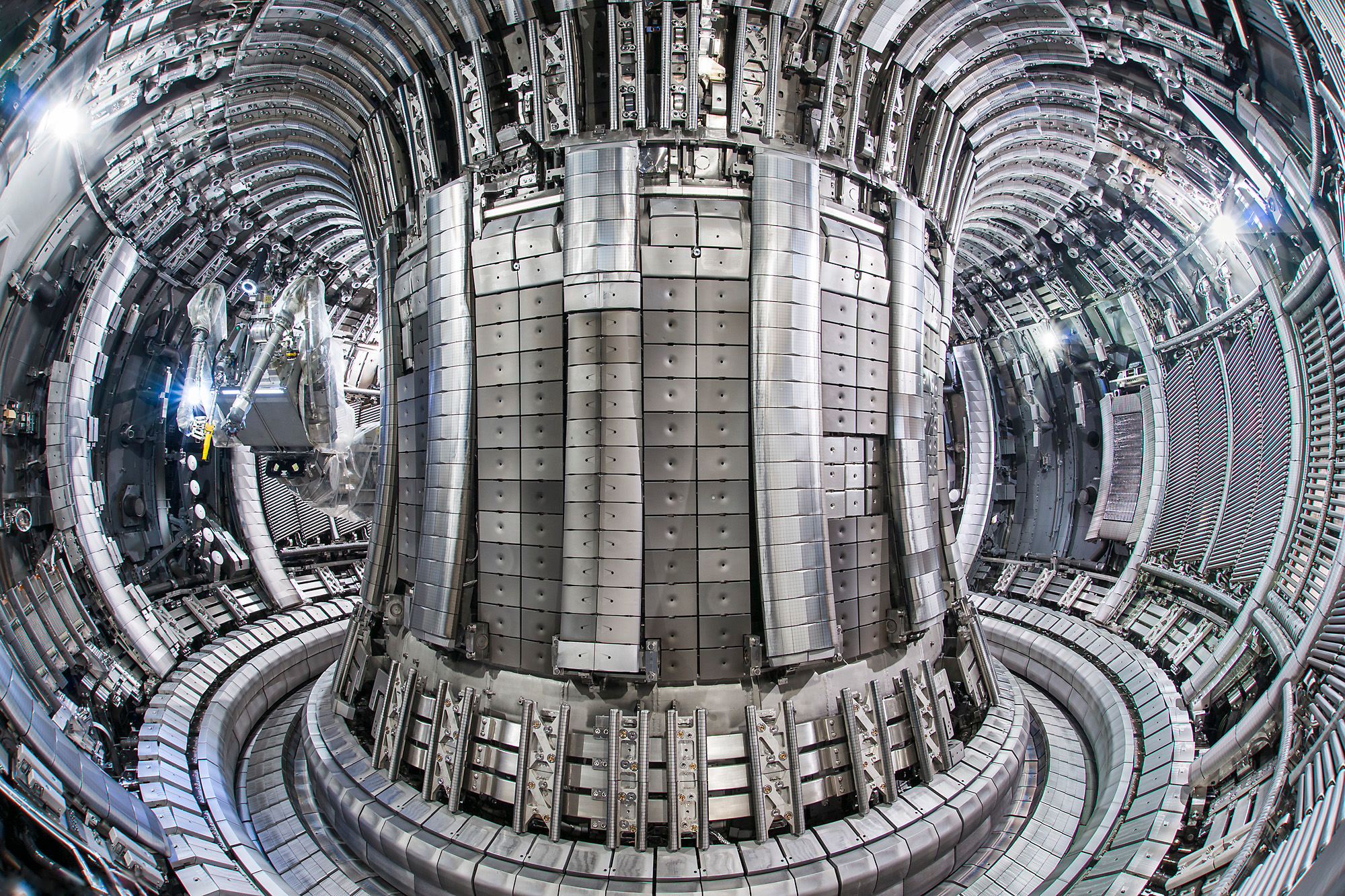
Inside the JET tokamak plasma vessel, maintenance robot to the left.

The UK began operating its first purpose-built tokamaks at Culham in the first half of the 1970s. The small Tosca was followed in 1975 by the larger Divertor and Injection Tokamak Experiment (DITE). This was a diverted tokamak with neutral beam heating, conceptually advanced for the time.

In 1977, following protracted negotiations, Culham was chosen as the site for the much larger Joint European Torus (JET) tokamak. Construction began in 1978 and was completed on time and on budget, with first plasma in June 1983. Since then the machine has gone on to set a series of fusion milestones, including the first demonstration of controlled deuterium-tritium fusion power (1991) and the record fusion power output of 16 megawatts (1997). Initially the JET facility was run by a multi-national team as a separate entity on the Culham site under the JET Joint Undertaking agreement. However, since 2000, UKAEA has been responsible for the operation of JET on behalf of its European research partners, through a contract with the European Commission.

In October 2009 the laboratory was renamed from UKAEA Culham to the Culham Centre for Fusion Energy as part of organisational changes at its parent body, the United Kingdom Atomic Energy Authority (UKAEA). In 2014 it was announced the centre would house the new Remote Applications in Challenging Environments (RACE). It has also been engaged in work towards the final detailed design of ITER as well as preparatory work in support of DEMOnstration Power Plant (DEMO). In 2021 and 2023 JET ran its second and third fusion power campaigns, setting a new record for fusion energy (as opposed to power) production.

On 7 September 2023, the UK Government announced that, "In line with the preferences of the UK fusion sector, the UK has decided to pursue a domestic fusion energy strategy instead of associating to the EU's Euratom programme." JET ceased operations that year, following its second and final tritium campaign. As of 2026, it remains in decommissioning.

=== Spherical tokamaks and post-JET plans ===
The unique narrow centre stack of MAST, seen from below.

In the 1980s, Culham Laboratory was instrumental in the development of the spherical tokamak concept – a more compact version of the tokamak in which plasma is held in a tighter magnetic field in a ‘cored apple’ shape instead of the conventional toroidal configuration. This is thought to offer potential advantages by enabling smaller, more efficient fusion devices. The START (Small Tight Aspect Ratio Tokamak) experiment at Culham (1991-1998) was the first full-sized spherical tokamak. Its impressive performance led to the construction of a larger device, MAST (Mega Ampere Spherical Tokamak), which operated between 2000 and 2013.

In 2019, the United Kingdom Atomic Energy Authority launched the Spherical Tokamak for Energy Production project, which has been described as "a Manhattan Project” in scale.

== Current activities ==
=== UK fusion programme ===
CCFE has a broad ranging programme of activities encompassing tokamak plasma physics, technology developments for the DEMO prototype fusion power plant, the development of materials suitable for a fusion environment, engineering activities, the training of students, graduates and apprentices, and public and industry outreach activities.

It also participates in a co-ordinated European programme, which is managed by the EUROfusion consortium of research institutes. This is focussed on delivering the European fusion road map, with the goal of achieving fusion electricity by 2050.

CCFE is involved in a number of other international collaborations, notably the ITER tokamak being built at Cadarache in France. As well as contributing to scientific preparations for ITER with plasma physics experiments at Culham, CCFE is developing technology for the project – such as remote handling applications, specialist heating systems and instrumentation for plasma measurements (‘diagnostics’).

In June 2021 it was announced that a new fusion demonstration plant was to be built at the CCFE, by a consortium including General Fusion with backing from Jeff Bezos. In 2021, it was planned to be operational by 2025.

=== MAST Upgrade ===
The focus of the UK domestic fusion programme is MAST Upgrade – a more powerful, better-equipped successor to the Mega Ampere Spherical Tokamak. Construction of MAST Upgrade started in 2013, and commissioning started in 2019.

MAST Upgrade will be implemented in three stages. Funding was agreed with the Engineering and Physical Sciences Research Council for the core upgrade (Stage 1a), which began plasma operations in 2020. Two additional phases (Stage 1b and Stage 2) will follow in later years subject to funding.

MAST Upgrade has three main missions:

1. Make the case for a fusion Component Test Facility (CTF). A CTF would test reactor systems for DEMO, and a spherical tokamak is seen as an ideal design for the facility;
2. Add to the knowledge base for ITER and help resolve key plasma physics issues to ensure its success;
3. Test reactor systems. MAST Upgrade will be the first tokamak to trial the innovative Super-X divertor – a high-power exhaust system that reduces power loads from particles leaving the plasma. If successful, Super-X could be used in DEMO and other future fusion devices.

=== Joint European Torus (JET) ===
CCFE participated in the JET scientific programme alongside the other 28 EUROfusion research organisations until it ceased operations in 2023.

CCFE was also responsible for the operation and safety of the JET facilities on behalf of EUROfusion. Its engineers also had the task of maintaining and upgrading JET to meet the demands of the research programme. Upgrades were largely carried out using a sophisticated remote handling system which avoided the need for manual entry. For example, in 2009 to 2011, remote handling engineers stripped out the interior of JET to fit a new 4,500-tile inner wall to enable researchers to test materials for the forthcoming ITER tokamak.

As of 2026, CCFE is responsible for decommissioning the machine.

== Funding ==
Funding for CCFE's domestic fusion programme is provided by a grant from the Engineering and Physical Sciences Research Council. The operation of JET is funded under a bilateral contract between the United Kingdom Atomic Energy Authority and the European Commission.

== Past Directors ==
- 1960–1966: John Adams
- 1966–1981: Bas Pease
- 1981–1990: Mick Lomer
- 1990–1996: Don Sweetman
- 1996–2002: Derek Robinson
- 2002–2003: Frank Briscoe (Acting Director)
- 2003–2008: Christopher Llewellyn Smith
- 2008–2016: Steven Cowley
- 2016–2024: Ian Chapman

== See also ==
- List of plasma physics software
