= Alan Herbert Glasser =

Alan Herbert Glasser is an American physicist.

While working for the Los Alamos National Laboratory, Glasser was elected a fellow of the American Physical Society in 1999, "[f]or contributions to the theory of toroidal ideal and Resistive magnetohydrodynamics instabilities and their applications to plasma confinement for magnetic fusion energy research."

Dr. Glasser was born in New York City on September 8, 1943, and grew up on Long Island, graduating from Lawrence High School in 1961. He received a B.A. in Physics from Columbia College in New York in 1965; an MS in Physics from the University of California at San Diego (UCSD) in 1967; and a Ph.D. in Physics from UCSD in 1972.

He was a postdoc and staff member at the Princeton Plasma Physics Laboratory from 1972 to 1979; a Professor of Physics at Auburn University from 1980 to 1984; a staff member and group leader at Los Alamos National Laboratory from 1984 to 2009; and a Research Faculty Member at the University of Washington from 2009 to 2015. In 2014 he created a corporation, Fusion Theory and Computation, Inc., which has been funded by the U.S. Department of Energy, Office of Fusion Energy Sciences.

Glasser's research has focused on theoretical and computational plasma physics applied to magnetic Fusion energy. His principal contributions have been to ideal and resistive magnetohydrodynamic (MHD) instabilities of tokamaks and stellarators; extended MHD simulation of fusion plasmas; and Hamiltonian particle orbit simulation in electromagnetic fields. He has multiple publications in peer-reviewed scientific journals and multiple computer codes that are widely used in the international magnetic fusion energy community.

Alan was married to Sheryl Wain Glasser from 1966 to 1997. They have two grown children, Russell and Keryn, who live in Austin, Texas. Alan has been married to Marganne Hesch Glasser since 1999. They live in Kingston, Washington.
