= Ian Chapman (physicist) =

British physicist and CEO of UKAEA

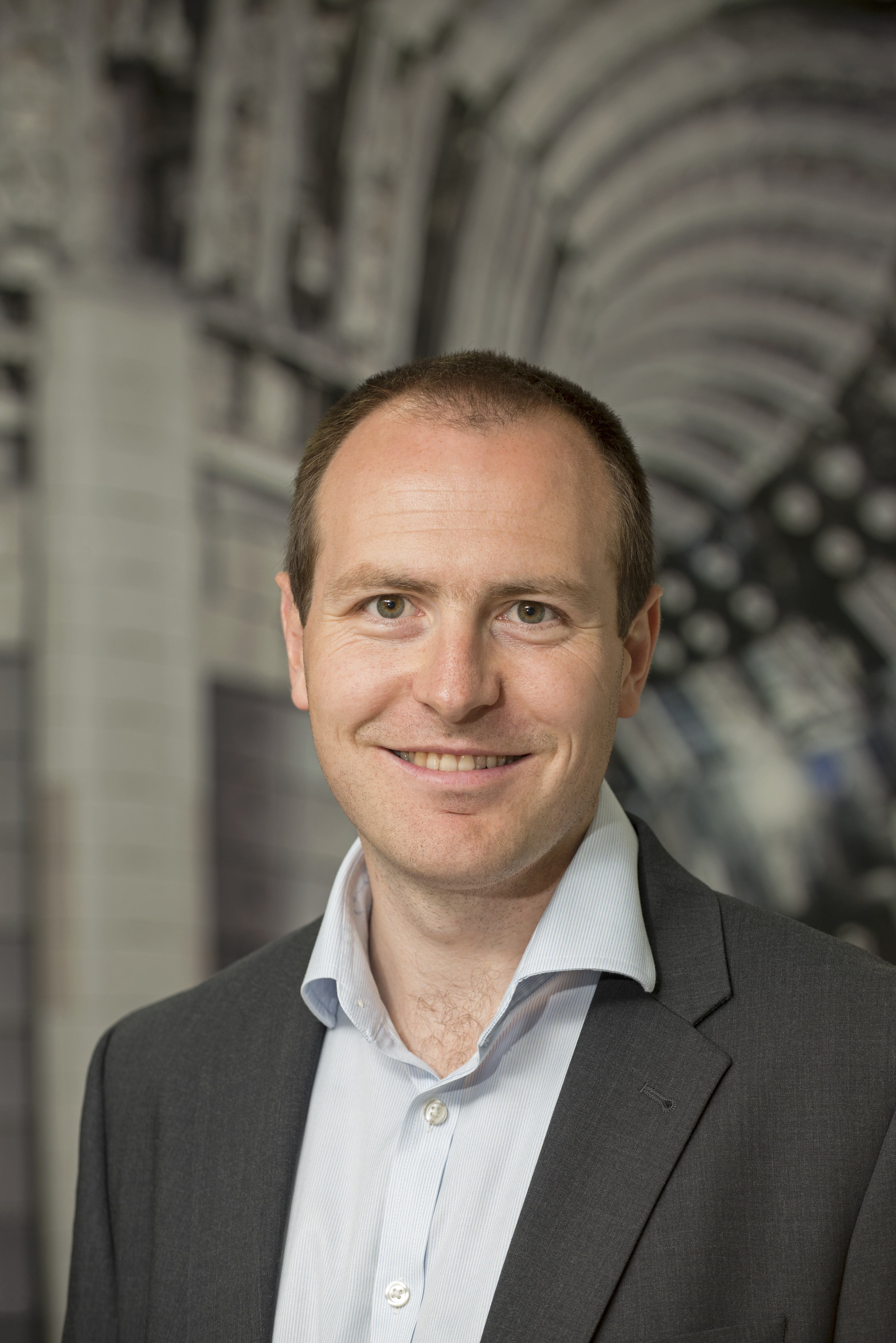
Professor Ian Chapman, CEO of UK Research and Innovation

Sir Ian Trevelyan Chapman FREng FRS FInstP is a British physicist who is the chief executive of UK Research and Innovation, the UK research funding agency. He was appointed to this post, following previously being the chief executive of the United Kingdom Atomic Energy Authority (UKAEA).

== Education ==
Chapman went to school at Elizabeth College, Guernsey. He graduated from Durham University (Hild Bede College) with an M.Sci. in Mathematics and Physics in 2004.

Chapman then joined UKAEA's Culham laboratory as a plasma physics PhD student with Imperial College London. His research focused on understanding and controlling instabilities in the plasma fuel within tokamak fusion devices. He received his PhD in 2008.

== Career ==
Chapman continued his plasma physics research at Culham and progressed through a number of positions in the UK fusion programme, including Head of Tokamak Science in 2014 and Fusion Programme Manager in 2015. In October 2016 he became UKAEA's Chief Executive Officer, succeeding Sir Steven Cowley.

He has published over 110 journal papers and given 30 invited lead-author presentations at international conferences. In 2015, he became a visiting professor at Durham University.

=== National and international roles ===
Chapman has held a number of international roles in fusion research. He was a Task Force Leader for the Joint European Torus fusion device from 2012 to 2014. He was appointed a member of the programme advisory committee for US experiment NSTX-U in 2013. He has chaired international working groups for the international fusion project ITER and led work packages within the EU fusion programme.

In April 2024, Chapman was appointed as non-executive director of the UK research funding agency, UKRI.

== Awards and honours ==
Chapman's research has been recognised with a number of notable awards, including:

- SET For Britain Best Early Career Physicist (2011)
- International Union of Pure and Applied Physics Young Scientist Prize (2012)
- Fellow of the Institute of Physics (2013)
- Institute of Physics Clifford Paterson Medal and Prize (2013)
- European Physical Society Early Career Prize (2014)
- Fellow of the Royal Academy of Engineering (2022)
- Fellow of the Royal Society (2023)

Chapman was knighted in the 2023 New Year Honours for services to global fusion energy.
