= Genesis Mission =

United States government initiative

- Mission statement: To build a national AI scientist platform
- Owner: United States
- Website: genesis.energy.gov

Genesis Mission is an initiative launched by the United States federal government to accelerate scientific research through artificial intelligence (AI) technology. It was announced in November 2025.

The goal of Genesis Mission is to create a centralized AI platform to advance scientific development and enhance the nation's technological competitiveness. It incorporated collaboration between the public and private sectors.

The initiative was introduced by the White House, which argued that it will benefit strategic importance for national progress. President Donald Trump announced the mission. The Department of Energy (DOE) said that Genesis will leverage AI computing to solve complex scientific problems. One of the mission's stated aims is to position the United States as the global leader of the AI revolution.

As a part of the Genesis Mission:

- Princeton Plasma Physics Laboratory is making a digital twin of the Lab's primary fusion experiment, the National Spherical Torus Experiment-Upgrade, and a new computational infrastructure called STELLAR-AI to speed up computer simulations.
- Argonne National Laboratory is partnering with DOE, Nvidia and Oracle to host two AI supercomputers.
- Oak Ridge National Laboratory will host two new computer systems called Discovery, an HPE system expected in 2028, and Lux, an AI cluster expected in 2026.

The Genesis Mission has been criticized by researchers and officials for moving money from previous aggressive cuts during the Trump administration to the Genesis Mission program, thus forcing researchers to adopt new research areas that Trump favors. The Genesis Mission has essentially restructured a large part of US national science funding. This has been criticized for creating a chaotic funding environment, giving researchers only six weeks to write proposals and little guidance on how to write them; the proposals also did not undergo peer review. Critics, such as Jules Barbati-Dajches at the Union of Concerned Scientists, say that Genesis Mission should be viewed as part of a pattern of anti-science actions.

Trump has also tasked Michael Kratsios to lead the initiative. Kratsios is not a scientist and has strong ties to the tech industry—he was previously Peter Thiel's chief of staff—raising concerns about whether Kratsios and the Genesis Mission is "more aligned with Silicon Valley ambitions than the public good". The Genesis Mission requires researchers to provide deliverables not traditionally present in academic funding agreements, such as data products that will be shared with industry partners to use for private business purposes.

== See also ==
- Stargate LLC
