= Richard J. Buttery =

British-American plasma physicist

- Born: Richard John Buttery
- Citizenship: United Kingdom; United States (since 2009)
- Education: University of Manchester (B.Sc., Ph.D.)
- Scientific career
- Fields: Plasma physics
- Institutions: UKAEA, General Atomics
- Thesis: The photon fragmentation function (1994)
- Doctoral advisor: John Storrow

Richard John Buttery is a British-American theoretical plasma physicist and the director of the DIII-D National Fusion Facility at General Atomics. He is an elected fellow of the Institute of Physics and the American Physical Society.

== Early life and career ==
Buttery obtained a B.Sc. in Physics and a Ph.D. in theoretical particle physics from the University of Manchester in 1990 and 1994 respectively. His dissertation was on the photon fragmentation function in quantum chromodynamics.

Following his graduation, Buttery joined the United Kingdom Atomic Energy Authority, where he worked at the Mega Ampere Spherical Tokamak (MAST) and the Joint European Torus (JET) for 16 years until 2009. In that year, Buttery relocated to the United States and joined General Atomics as a program planning coordinator for the DIII-D National Fusion Facility. In 2012, Buttery became the Director for Experimental Science and has been leading the DIII-D scientific team ever since.

== Scientific contributions ==
Buttery is a member of the American Physical Society Division of Plasma Physics Executive Committee and the U.S. Burning Plasma Organization Council.

== Honors and awards ==
Buttery was elected as a fellow of the Institute of Physics in 2009.

In 2019, he was elected as a fellow of the American Physical Society for "pioneering contributions to the understanding of magnetohydrodynamics stability in tokamak plasmas, including the physics of tearing modes and magnetic field errors, and for outstanding scientific leadership of national and international fusion research ".
