= Divertor and Injection Tokamak Experiment =

DITE
Divertor and Injection Tokamak Experiment
- Device type: Tokamak
- Location: Culham, Oxfordshire, UK
- Affiliation: Culham Centre for Fusion Energy

Technical specifications
- Major radius: 1.17 m (3 ft 10 in)
- Minor radius: 0.26 m (10 in)
- Magnetic field: 2.7 T (27,000 G)
- Heating power: >2 MW NBI
- Plasma current: 350 kA
- Plasma temperature: 1 keV (ions); 1.8 keV (electrons)
- Plasma density: 1×10^{20} m^{−3}

History
- Year(s) of operation: 1975–1989
- Preceded by: Tosca
- Succeeded by: JET

The Divertor and Injection Tokamak Experiment, abbreviated DITE, was an early tokamak magnetic confinement fusion experiment built and operated at UKAEA Culham in the UK from 1975. Its main features were a 'bundle' divertor, and heating by tangential neutral beams which could drive additional plasma current.

DITE followed the CLEO stellarator, which had been operated as a tokamak without its helical windings. This signalled the start of the shift of the UK's fusion programme from the stellarator to the tokamak, especially as the UKAEA lab was chosen in 1977 to host the Euratom JET, a large tokamak funded by numerous West European countries including West Germany, France, and Italy.

DITE was operated in steady state mode with the plasma current driven entirely by neutral beam injection rather than inductive Ohmic heating. Although the beam-injected current was relatively low even by contemporary standards, this steady state operation of a tokamak was a leading capability at the time.

== Related experiments ==
- Princeton Large Torus, USA
- T-10 tokamak, USSR
