= Mercier criterion =

Plasma criteria

The Mercier criterion is a criterion for plasma used in the theoretical study of plasma instability. It was first proposed in 1954 by C. Mercier, who applied the perturbation method (in which $\omega =\frac {\partial } {\partial t}$ represents the frequency and $\mathbf k = \frac {\partial} {\partial z}$ is the z-direction of the unit vector) to the plasma mathematical model to compute calculations.
