= Ballooning instability =

The ballooning instability (a.k.a. ballooning mode instability) is a type of internal pressure-driven plasma instability usually seen in tokamak fusion power reactors or in space plasmas. It is important in fusion research as it determines a set of criteria for the maximum achievable plasma beta. The name refers to the shape and action of the instability, which acts like the elongations formed in a long balloon when it is squeezed. In literature, the structure of these elongations are commonly referred to as 'fingers'.

The narrow fingers of plasma produced by the instability are capable of accelerating and pushing aside the surrounding magnetic field in order to cause a sudden, explosive release of energy. Thus, the instability is also known as the explosive instability.

== Dispersion Relation ==
The dispersion relation is

$\omega (\omega - \omega _*pi) = [Sk_\parallel ^2 -2\mu _0 \kappa \nabla P /\beta^2 ](1+b_i )V_A ^2$

where

$S=1+n_e \delta/n_ec$ ,

$\delta = \beta_e/ (\omega_*pi -\omega_*ep )/ 2(\omega - q_i T_- \omega_*pi)b_i) /(\omega - \omega_*e) -3/2 (\omega - \omega _*pe)b_i /( \omega - \omega - \omega_*e) (\omega_Be +\omega _ke) /2\omega$

== Relation to interchange instability ==
The interchange instability can be derived from the equations of the ballooning instability as a special case in which the ballooning mode does not perturb the equilibrium magnetic field. This special limit is known as the Mercier criterion.
