= Pegasus Toroidal Experiment =

Plasma physics experiment

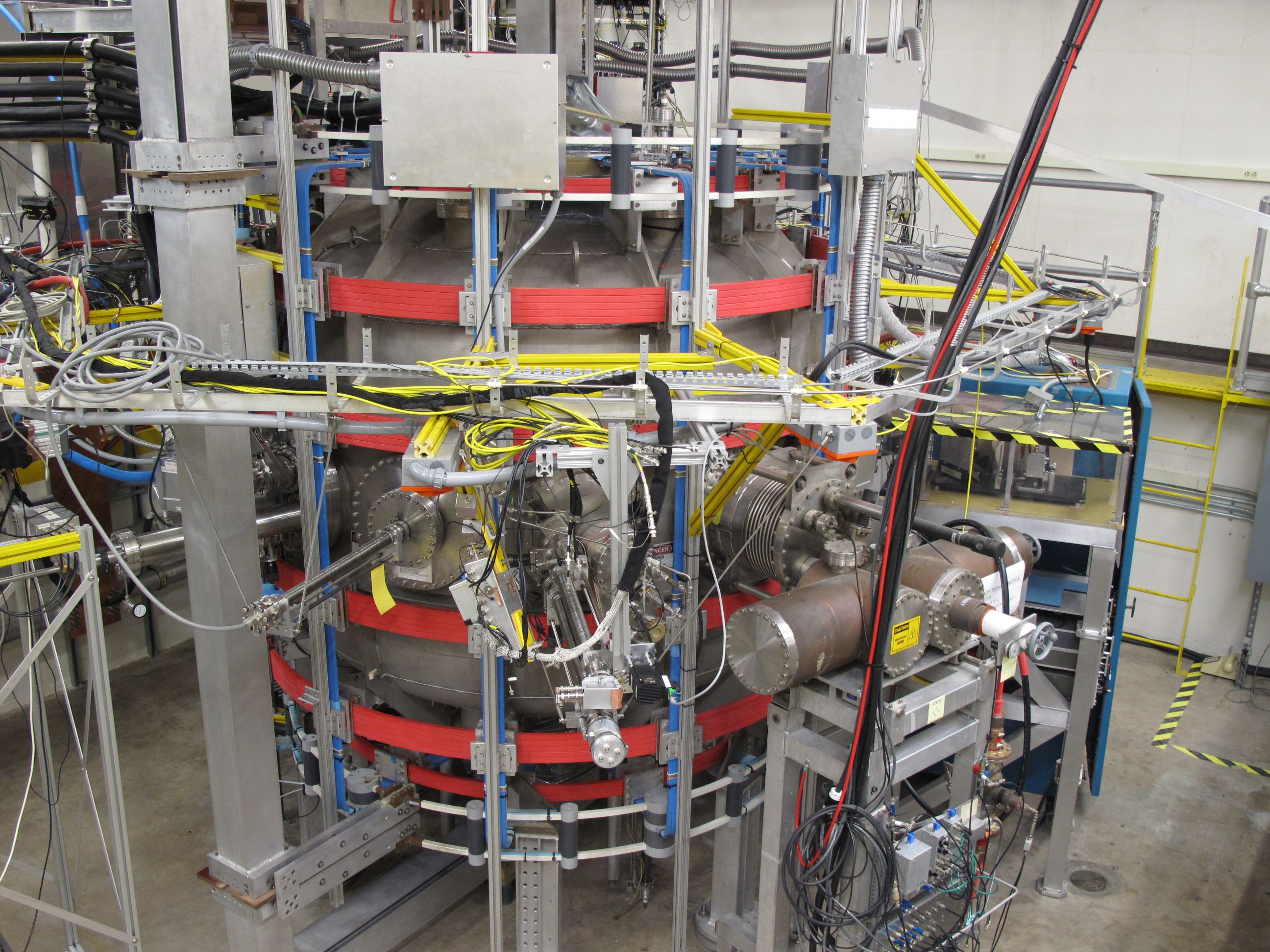
- Device type: Spherical tokamak
- Location: Madison, Wisconsin, US
- Affiliation: University of Wisconsin–Madison

Technical specifications
- Major radius: 45 cm (18 in)
- Minor radius: 40 cm (16 in)

Links
- Website: Pegasus Toroidal Experiment webpage

The Pegasus Toroidal Experiment is a plasma confinement experiment relevant to fusion power production, run by the Department of Nuclear Engineering & Engineering Physics of the University of Wisconsin–Madison. It is a spherical tokamak, a very low-aspect-ratio version of the tokamak configuration, i.e. the minor radius of the torus is comparable to the major radius.

== Local Helicity Injection ==
Pegasus is used to study start up of spherical tokamaks using local helicity injection.

== URANIA ==
Pegasus is being upgraded in 2019 (e.g. by removal of the central solenoid) to build the Unified Reduced Non-Inductive Assessment (URANIA) experiment. This will study plasma startup using transient coaxial helicity injection (CHI).

The max toroidal field is being increased from 0.15 T to 0.6 T, and the pulse duration from 25 to 100 ms.
