= National Spherical Torus Experiment =

US nuclear fusion reactor

NSTX
National Spherical Torus Experiment
- NSTX in 2009
- Device type: Spherical tokamak
- Location: Princeton, New Jersey, US
- Affiliation: Princeton Plasma Physics Laboratory

Technical specifications
- Major radius: 0.85 m (2 ft 9 in)
- Minor radius: 0.68 m (2 ft 3 in)
- Magnetic field: 0.3 T (3,000 G)
- Heating power: 11 MW
- Plasma current: 1.4 MA

History
- Year(s) of operation: 1999–July 2016
- Preceded by: Tokamak Fusion Test Reactor (TFTR)

Links
- Website: NSTX-U official website

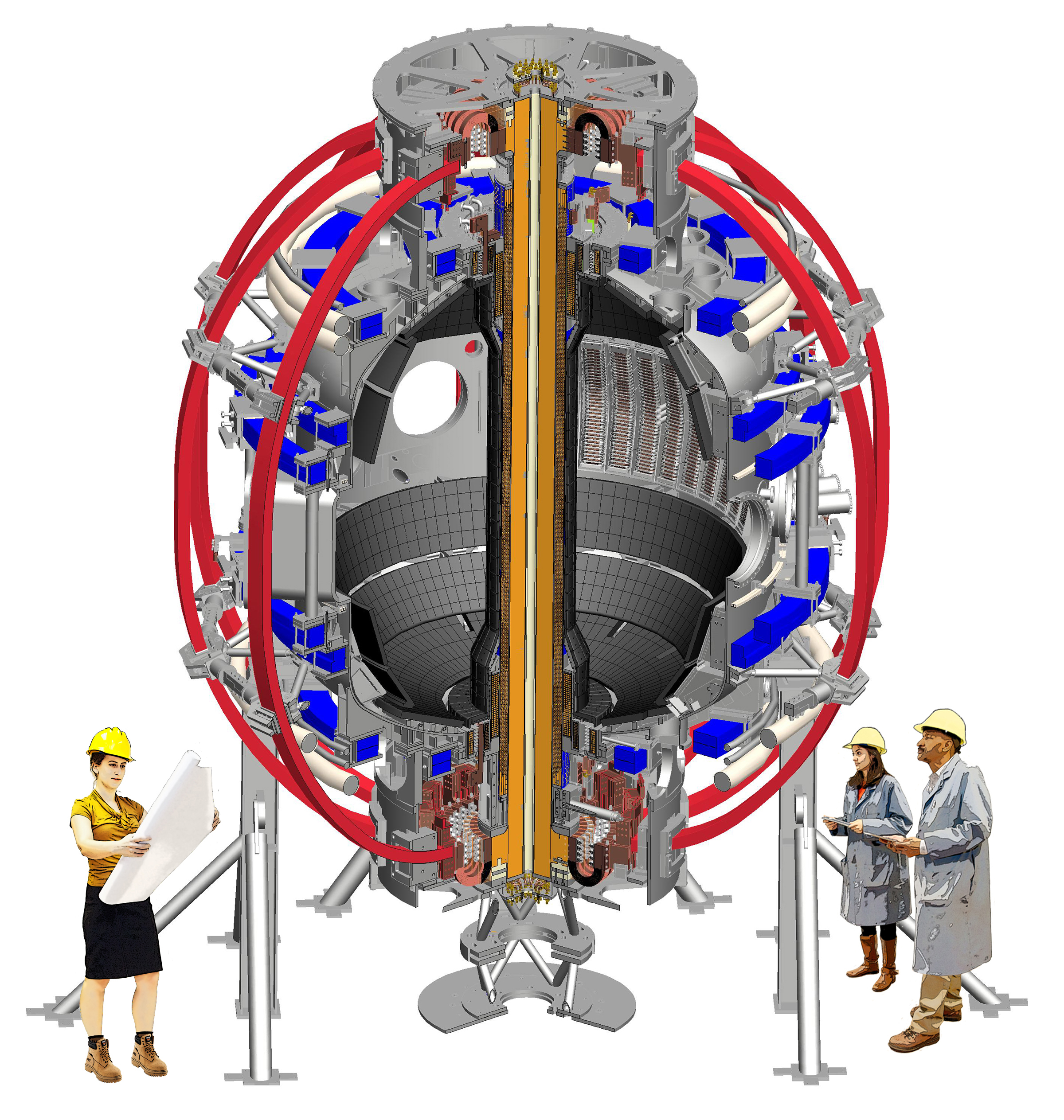
CAD drawing of NSTX

The National Spherical Torus Experiment (NSTX) is a magnetic fusion device based on the spherical tokamak concept. It was constructed by the Princeton Plasma Physics Laboratory (PPPL) in collaboration with the Oak Ridge National Laboratory, Columbia University, and the University of Washington at Seattle. It entered service in 1999. In 2012 it was shut down as part of an upgrade program and became NSTX-U, U for Upgrade.

Like other magnetic confinement fusion experiments, NSTX studies the physics principles of thermonuclear plasmas—ionized gases with sufficiently high temperatures and densities for nuclear fusion to occur—which are confined in a magnetic field.

The spherical tokamak design implemented by NSTX is an offshoot of the conventional tokamak. Proponents claim that spherical tokamaks have dramatic practical advantages over conventional tokamaks. For this reason the spherical tokamak has seen considerable interest since it was proposed in the late 1980s. However, development remains effectively one generation behind mainline tokamak efforts such as JET. Other major spherical tokamak experiments include the START and MAST at Culham in the UK. In 2019 the UK launched its Spherical Tokamak for Energy Production, described as "a Manhattan Project” in scale.

== History ==
=== 1999–2012 ===
First plasma was obtained on NSTX on Friday, February 12, 1999 at 7:06 p.m.

Magnetic fusion experiments use plasmas composed of one or more hydrogen isotopes. For example, in 1994, PPPL's Tokamak Fusion Test Reactor (TFTR) produced a world-record 10.7 megawatts of fusion power from a plasma composed of equal parts of deuterium and tritium, a fuel mix likely to be used in commercial fusion power reactors. NSTX was a "proof of principle" experiment and therefore employed deuterium plasmas only. If successful it was to be followed by similar devices, eventually including a demonstration power reactor (e.g. ITER), burning deuterium-tritium fuel.

NSTX produced a spherical plasma with a hole through its center (a "cored apple" profile; see MAST), different from the doughnut-shaped (toroidal) plasmas of conventional tokamaks. The low aspect ratio A (that is, an R/a of 1.31, with the major radius R of 0.85 m and the minor radius a of 0.65 m) experimental NSTX device had several advantages including plasma stability through improved confinement. Design challenges include the toroidal and poloidal field coils, vacuum vessels and plasma-facing components. This plasma configuration can confine a higher pressure plasma than a doughnut tokamak of high aspect ratio for a given, confinement magnetic field strength. Since the amount of fusion power produced is proportional to the square of the plasma pressure, the use of spherically shaped plasmas could allow the development of smaller, more economical and more stable fusion reactors. NSTX's attractiveness may be further enhanced by its ability to trap a high "bootstrap" electric current. This self-driven internal plasma current would reduce the power requirements of externally driven plasma currents required to heat and confine the plasma.

=== Upgrade 2012–2015 ===
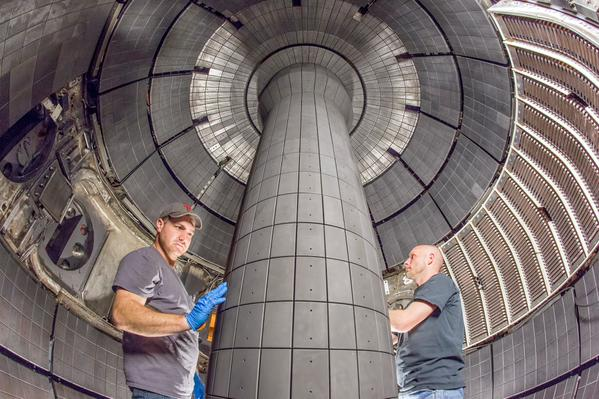
Vacuum vessel during the upgrade

The $94 million NSTX-U (Upgrade) was completed in 2015. It doubles the toroidal field (to 1 Tesla), plasma current (to 2 MA) and heating power. It increases the pulse duration by a factor of five. To achieve this the central stack (CS) solenoid was widened, and an OH coil, inner poloidal coils, and a 2nd neutral-ion beam line were added. This upgrade consisted of a copper coil installation, not a superconducting coil.

=== Poloidal coil problem 2016 and Recovery 2016–present ===
The NSTX-U (Upgrade) was stopped in late 2016 just after its update, due to a failure of one its poloidal coils. The NSTX had been shut down since 2012 and only returned for 10 weeks at the end of 2016 just after it was updated.

The origin of this failure is partly attributed to a non-compliance of the chilled copper winding, the manufacture of which had been sub-contracted. After a diagnostic phase requiring the complete dismantling of the device and coils, evaluation of the design, and a redesign of major components including the six inner poloidal coils, a restarting plan was adopted in March 2018, with reactivation scheduled for the end of 2020, though this was later pushed back to 2022.

In 2021 the US DOE estimated the total cost of the 'recovery' project at $199.4 million. As of 2022, the restart was still delayed due to an insulation problem between the central solenoid and the coils around it. As of 2026, NSTX-U was expected to re-start in 2027.

== Sources ==
- "National Spherical Torus Experiment". Princeton Plasma Physics Laboratory. Archived from the original on 2021-03-20. – Original source for this article was an earlier version of this page.
- "Schematic diagram of NSTX". Princeton Plasma Physics Laboratory.
- Schematic diagram of NSTX-U Facility Upgraded Components
