= Proto-Sphera =

Proto-Sphera is an Italian experiment in the ENEA research laboratory at Frascati, Italy, aiming to study the development of a spherical fusion reactor using a plasma to replace the usual central column. The device used is the repurposed Small Tight Aspect Ratio Tokamak.

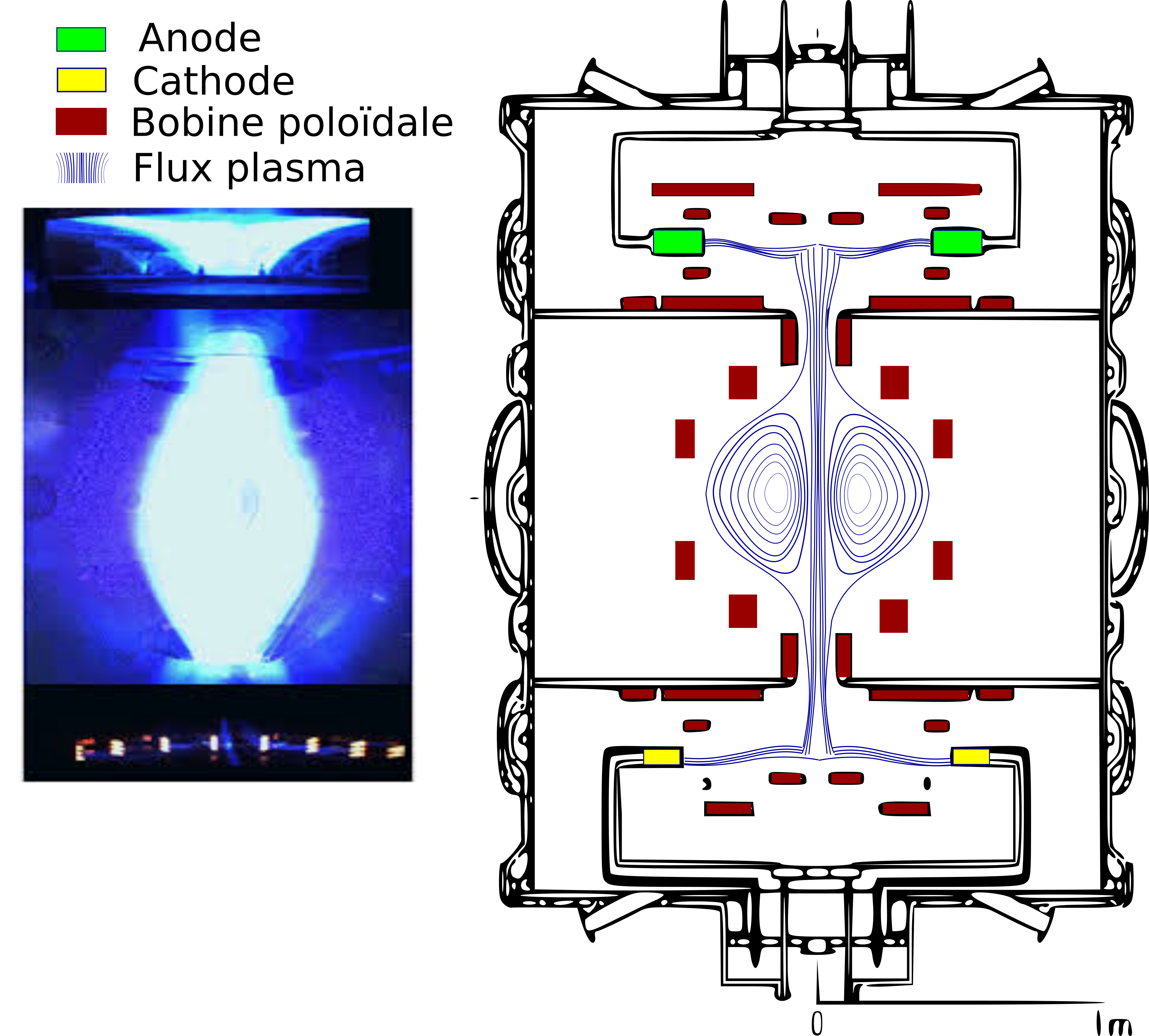
right diagram of the device (right) photo of the plasma (left)
