= Kink instability =

Current-driven plasma instability

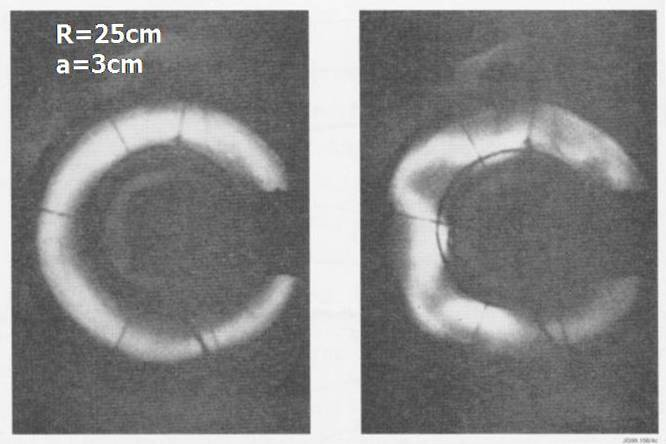
One of the earliest photos of the kink instability in action - the 3 by 25 cm pyrex tube at Aldermaston.

A kink instability (also known as a kink oscillation or kink mode) is a current-driven plasma instability characterized by transverse displacements of a plasma column's cross-section from its center of mass without any change in the characteristics of the plasma. It typically develops in a thin plasma column carrying a strong axial current which exceeds the Kruskal–Shafranov limit and is sometimes known as the Kruskal–Shafranov (kink) instability, named after Martin David Kruskal and Vitaly Shafranov.

The kink instability was first widely explored in fusion power machines with Z-pinch configurations in the 1950s. It is one of the common magnetohydrodynamic instability modes which can develop in a pinch plasma and is sometimes referred to as the $m=1$ mode. (The other is the $m=0$ mode known as the sausage instability.)

If a "kink" begins to develop in a column the magnetic forces on the inside of the kink become larger than those on the outside, which leads to growth of the perturbation. As it develops at fixed areas in the plasma, kinks belong to the class of "absolute plasma instabilities", as opposed to convective processes.
