= Princeton Plasma Physics Laboratory =

Laboratory in Princeton, New Jersey, United States

- Established: 1961; 65 years ago
- Budget: $116 million (2021)
- Field of research: Nuclear fusion, Plasma Physics, High-performance computing
- Vice president: David J. McComas
- Director: Steven Cowley
- Location: 100 Stellarator Road, Princeton, New Jersey, Plainsboro Township, New Jersey, 08536, United States; 40.348825°N 74.602183°W
- Campus: Forrestal Campus
- Affiliations: United States Department of Energy
- Operating agency: Princeton University
- Website: pppl.gov

Map
- Location within New Jersey

The Princeton Plasma Physics Laboratory (PPPL) is a United States Department of Energy national laboratory for plasma physics and nuclear fusion science. Its primary mission is research into and development of fusion as an energy source. It is known for the development of the stellarator and tokamak designs, along with numerous fundamental advances in plasma physics and the exploration of many other plasma confinement concepts.

PPPL grew out of the top-secret Cold War project to control thermonuclear reactions, called Project Matterhorn. The focus of this program changed from H-bombs to fusion power in 1951, when Lyman Spitzer developed the stellarator concept and was granted funding from the Atomic Energy Commission to study the concept. This led to a series of machines in the 1950s and 1960s. In 1961, after declassification, Project Matterhorn was renamed the Princeton Plasma Physics Laboratory.

PPPL's stellarators proved unable to meet their performance goals. In 1968, Soviet claims of excellent performance on their T-3 tokamak generated brief scepticism until verified by British scientists. PPPL's Model C stellarator was quickly converted to a tokamak, and reproduced T-3's high performance. Until the 1990s, PPPL became a worldwide leader in tokamak theory and design, building a series of record-breaking machines including the Princeton Large Torus and TFTR. In 1993, TFTR was the first machine in the world to produce significant amounts of power from fusion, remaining the world record holder until 1997.

Dozens of smaller machines were also built to test particular problems and solutions, including the ATC, NSTX, and LTX. PPPL is operated by Princeton University on the Forrestal Campus in Plainsboro Township, New Jersey.

== History ==
=== Formation ===
In 1950, John Wheeler was setting up a secret H-bomb research lab at Princeton University. Lyman Spitzer, Jr., an avid mountaineer, was aware of this program and suggested the name "Project Matterhorn".

Spitzer was a professor of astronomy who studied plasma in interstellar space. While leaving for a ski trip to Aspen in February 1951, his father told him about a front page New York Times story reporting claims from Argentina that its Huemul Project had achieved nuclear fusion. Spitzer ultimately dismissed these claims, which proved erroneous, but while riding the chairlift at Aspen he struck upon a new concept to confine a dense terrestrial plasma for long periods at high fusion temperatures. He called this concept the stellarator.

Later that year he took this design to the Atomic Energy Commission in Washington. As a result of this meeting and a review of the invention by scientists throughout the nation, the stellarator proposal was funded in 1951. As the device would produce high-energy neutrons, which could be used for breeding weapon fuel, the program was classified and carried out as part of Project Matterhorn. Matterhorn ultimately ended its involvement in the bomb field in 1954, becoming entirely devoted to the fusion power field.

In 1958, this magnetic fusion research was declassified following the United Nations International Conference on the Peaceful Uses of Atomic Energy. This generated an influx of graduate students eager to learn the "new" physics, which in turn influenced the lab to concentrate more on basic research.

The early figure-8 stellarators included: Model-A, Model-B, Model-B2, Model-B3. Model-B64 was a square with round corners, and Model-B65 had a racetrack configuration. The last and most powerful early Princeton stellarator was the "racetrack" Model C, operating from 1961 to 1969.

=== Tokamak ===
By the mid-1960s it was clear something was fundamentally wrong with the Princeton stellarators, as they leaked fuel at rates far beyond what theory predicted, rates that carried away energy from the plasma that was far beyond what the fusion reactions could ever produce. Spitzer became extremely skeptical that fusion energy was possible and expressed this opinion in very public fashion in 1965 at an international meeting in the UK. At the same meeting, the Soviet delegation announced results about 10 times better than any previous device, which Spitzer dismissed as a measurement error.

At the next meeting in 1968, the Soviets presented considerable data from their devices that showed even greater performance, about 100 times the Bohm diffusion limit. An enormous argument broke out between the AEC and the various labs about whether this was real. When a UK team verified the results in 1969, the AEC suggested PPPL to convert their Model C to a tokamak to test it, as the only lab willing to build one from scratch, Oak Ridge, would need some time to build theirs. Seeing the possibility of being bypassed in the fusion field, PPPL eventually agreed to convert the Model C to what became the Symmetric Tokamak (ST), quickly verifying the approach.

Two small machines followed the ST, exploring ways to heat the plasma, and then the Princeton Large Torus (PLT) to test whether the theory that larger machines would be more stable was true. Starting in 1975, PLT verified these "scaling laws" and then went on to add neutral beam injection from Oak Ridge that resulted in a series of record-setting plasma temperatures, eventually topping out at 78 million kelvins, well beyond what was needed for a practical fusion power system. Its success was major news.

With this string of successes, PPPL had little trouble winning the bid to build an even larger machine, one specifically designed to reach "breakeven" while running on an actual fusion fuel, rather than a test gas. This produced the Tokamak Fusion Test Reactor, or TFTR, which was completed in 1982. After a lengthy breaking-in period, TFTR began slowly increasing the temperature and density of the fuel, while introducing deuterium gas as the fuel. In April 1986, it demonstrated a combination of density and confinement, the so-called fusion triple product, well beyond what was needed for a practical reactor. In July, it reached a temperature of 200 million kelvins, far beyond what was needed. However, when the system was operated with both of these conditions at the same time, a high enough triple product and temperature, the system became unstable. Three years of effort failed to address these issues, and TFTR never reached its goal. The system continued performing basic studies on these problems until being shut down in 1997. Beginning in 1993, TFTR was the first in the world to use 1:1 mixtures of deuterium–tritium. In 1994 it yielded an unprecedented 10.7 megawatts of fusion power.

=== Later designs ===
In 1999, the National Spherical Torus Experiment (NSTX), based on the spherical tokamak concept, came online at the PPPL.

In 2004, PPPL began construction of a modular coil optimized stellarator, NCSX. It was cancelled by DOE in 2008 after budget and construction time overruns, while 80% complete.

In 2015, PPPL completed an upgrade to NSTX to produce NSTX-U that made it the most powerful experimental fusion facility, or tokamak, of its type in the world. It suffered extensive damage in operation and operations were suspended from July 2016. A recovery project began with an estimated total cost in 2021 of $199.4 million. As of 2026, NSTX-U was expected to re-start in 2027.

In 2024, the lab announced MUSE, a new stellarator. MUSE uses rare-earth permanent magnets with a field strength that can exceed 1.2 teslas. The device uses quasiaxisymmetry, a subtype of quasisymmetry. The research team claimed that its use of quasisymmetry was more sophisticated than prior devices. Two companies founded by former PPPL researchers to commercialize related stellarator technology are Thea Energy and Stellarex.

== Directors ==
The following persons served as the Princeton Plasma Physics Laboratory director:

| No. | Image | Director | Term start | Term end | Refs. |
|---|---|---|---|---|---|
| 1 | | Lyman Spitzer (Note: Spitzer was director of Project Matterhorn) | 1951 | 1961 | |
| 2 | | Melvin B. Gottlieb (Note: In 1961 Gottlieb became the first director of the renamed Princeton Plasma Physics Laboratory.) | 1961 | 1980 | |
| 3 | | Harold Fürth | 1981 | 1990 | |
| 4 | | Ronald C. Davidson | 1991 | December 31, 1996 | |
| interim | | John A. Schmidt | January 1, 1997 | June 30, 1997 | |
| 5 | | Robert J. Goldston | July 1, 1997 | 2008 | |
| 6 | | Stewart C. Prager | 2008 | September 26, 2016 | |
| interim | | Terrence K. Brog | September 26, 2016 | September 2017 | |
| interim | | Richard J. Hawryluk | September 2017 | June 30, 2018 | |
| 7 | | Steven Cowley | July 1, 2018 | present | |

Table notes:

== Other domestic and international research activities ==
Laboratory scientists are collaborating with researchers on fusion science and technology at other facilities, including DIII-D in San Diego, EAST in China, JET in the United Kingdom, KSTAR in South Korea, the LHD in Japan, the Wendelstein 7-X (W7-X) device in Germany, and the International Thermonuclear Experimental Reactor (ITER) in France.

PPPL manages the U.S. ITER project activities together with Oak Ridge National Laboratory and Savannah River National Laboratory. The lab delivered 75% of components for the fusion energy experiment's electrical network in 2017 and has been leading the design and construction of six diagnostic tools for analyzing ITER plasmas. The PPPL physicist Richard Hawryluk served as ITER Deputy Director-General from 2011 to 2013. In 2022, PPPL staff developed with researchers from other national labs and universities over several months a US ITER research plan during the joint Fusion Energy Sciences Research Needs Workshop.

Staff are applying knowledge gained in fusion research to a number of theoretical and experimental areas including materials science, solar physics, chemistry, and manufacturing. PPPL also aims to speed the development of fusion energy through the development of an increased number of public-private partnerships.

=== Partnerships ===
PPPL collaborates with public institutions and private industry on fusion energy development, primarily through the U.S. Department of Energy's Innovation Network for Fusion Energy (INFUSE) program, which was launched in 2019 to give private companies access to national laboratory capabilities. The laboratory's corporate partners have included Tokamak Energy, Commonwealth Fusion Systems, TAE Technologies, General Fusion and Microsoft, working on projects ranging from plasma turbulence modeling to machine learning for predicting tokamak disruptions. In 2025, PPPL researchers participated in three of the 20 INFUSE projects funded by the department, including collaborations with Helion Energy and Thea Energy. The laboratory is also developing the Fusion Research and Technology Hub (FuRTH), a facility intended to allow private companies to install and operate experimental fusion systems using PPPL infrastructure such as radiation shielding and industrial-scale power and cooling systems.

Several additional partnerships were announced in 2026. In April, PPPL began leading a $12.5 million DOE-funded project to install X-ray imaging diagnostics on the WEST tokamak in France and the JT-60SA tokamak in Japan, with vacuum chambers, stands, mounts and other components built and tested by R-V Industries, a private manufacturer based in Honey Brook, Pennsylvania. In May, the venture firm SOSV announced that PPPL would provide technical collaboration and in-kind support to the HAX Plasma Forge, a startup incubator for plasma technology companies headquartered at SRI in Princeton, New Jersey, and backed by $51 million in funding from SOSV and the New Jersey Economic Development Authority. In June, Thea Energy, a stellarator company that spun out of Princeton University and PPPL in 2022, announced a collaboration with PPPL, Argonne National Laboratory, NVIDIA and Synopsys to develop a digital twin of its planned Helios fusion power plant, with PPPL supplying plasma modeling expertise and high-fidelity simulation codes.That same month, PPPL signed a memorandum of understanding with the United Kingdom Atomic Energy Authority establishing a program of collaboration that includes reciprocal staff exchanges, access to major research facilities, joint projects and cooperation on ITER diagnostics and advanced computing.

=== Plasma science and technology ===
- Beam Dynamics and Nonneutral Plasma
- Laboratory for Plasma Nanosynthesis (LPN)

=== Theoretical plasma physics ===
- DOE Scientific Simulation Initiative
- U.S. MHD Working Group
- Field Reversed Configuration (FRC) Theory Consortium
- Tokamak Physics Design and Analysis Codes
- TRANSP Code
- National Transport Code Collaboration (NTCC) Modules Library

=== AI/ML for fusion ===
In 2024, PPPL announced a reinforcement learning model that could forecast tearing mode instabilities up to 300 milliseconds in advance. That is enough time for the plasma controller to adjust operating parameters to prevent the tear and maintain H-mode performance.

PPPL is also leading the Simulation, Technology, and Experiment Leveraging Learning-Accelerated Research enabled by AI (STELLAR-AI ): a high performance computing platform for fusion energy simulations that will include CPUs, GPUs, and QPUs. The platform is a part of the DOE's national Genesis Mission. STELLAR-AI will be used for both tokamak and stellarator research, as it is being used to make a digital twin of NSTX-U and for a separate project known as StellFoundry. PPPL's StellFoundry project is using AI to expedite stellarator design, so that the configurations that are ideal for producing the temperatures, pressures and stability needed for efficient energy production via fusion.

The Lab also conducts AI for fusion research on tokamaks at other facilities. PPPL researchers were involved in experiments where they successfully demonstrated the use of their machine learning system on DIII-D and KSTAR, using it to suppress instabilities known as edge localize modes while maintaining plasma performance. The Lab's researchers were also involved in a project to create an AI system that provide missing sensor data. The system, known as Diag2Diag, offers more detailed data than the real-world sensor could have provided and could ultimately reduce the cost of commercial fusion systems by reducing the number of diagnostics required. Other AI research at PPPL includes improved models for plasma heating and better identification methods for the magnetic shadows in fusion reactors.

== Transportation ==
TigerTransit's Route 3 runs to Forrestal Campus and terminates at PPPL.

== See also ==
- List of plasma physics software
- Project Sherwood
- National Compact Stellarator Experiment (NCSX)
