= Mega Ampere Spherical Tokamak =

UK experimental fusion power reactor

Coordinates: 51°39′33″N 1°13′50″W

MAST
Mega Amp Spherical Tokamak
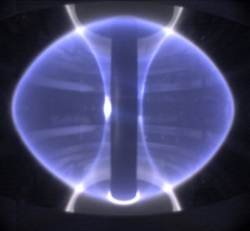
- Plasma in the MAST reactor
- Device type: Spherical tokamak
- Location: Culham, Oxfordshire, UK
- Affiliation: Culham Centre for Fusion Energy

Technical specifications
- Major radius: ~ 0.9 m (2 ft 11 in)
- Minor radius: ~ 0.6 m (2 ft 0 in)
- Plasma volume: 8 m^{3}
- Magnetic field: 0.55 T (5,500 G)
- Heating power: 5 MW
- Plasma current: 1.3 MA

History
- Date(s) of construction: 1997
- Year(s) of operation: 1999–2013
- Preceded by: Small Tight Aspect Ratio Tokamak (START)
- Succeeded by: MAST Upgrade

Mega Amp Spherical Tokamak (MAST) was a nuclear fusion experiment, testing a spherical tokamak nuclear fusion reactor, and commissioned by EURATOM/UKAEA. The original MAST experiment took place at the Culham Centre for Fusion Energy, Oxfordshire, England from December 1999 to September 2013. A successor experiment called MAST Upgrade began operation in 2020.

== Design ==
A spherical tokamak is shaped more like a cored apple than the conventional, doughnut-shaped toroidal design used by experiments such as ITER. Spherical tokamaks are more efficient in their use of the magnetic field.

MAST included a neutral beam injector for plasma heating. It used a merging compression technique for plasma formation instead of the conventional direct induction. Merging compression saves central solenoid flux, which can then be used to increase the plasma current and/or maintain the required current flat-top.

MAST's plasma volume was about 8 cubic meters. It confined plasmas with densities on the order of 10^{20}/m^{3}.

MAST's plasma had an almost circular outer profile. The extensions off the top and bottom are plasma flowing to the ring divertors, a key feature of modern tokamak designs.

== Experiments ==
MAST confirmed the increased operating efficiency of spherical tokamaks, demonstrating a high beta (ratio of plasma pressure to the pressure from the confining magnetic field). MAST performed experiments on controlling and mitigating instabilities at the edge of the plasma – so-called Edge Localised Modes or ELMs.

== History ==
=== MAST ===
MAST was designed to confirm the results of the earlier Small Tight Aspect Ratio Tokamak (START) experiment (1990-1998) in a larger, more purpose-built experiment.

The MAST design phase occupied 1995-1997, with construction beginning in 1997, and the first plasma obtained in 1999.

The first results of the MAST demonstrate that H-mode is reached with more ease and less energy than expected with a considerable improvement in confinement, a fundamental point for any energy production scenario. Finally, different scenarios have been successfully tested to decrease the energy flow in the central solenoid vs plasma current, which represents another fundamental point for designing a demo spherical tokamak.

Over its lifetime MAST produced 30,471 plasmas (in pulses up to 0.5 sec). In October 2013 the reactor was shut down for the upgrade to MAST Upgrade.

=== MAST Upgrade ===
MAST Upgrade is the successor experiment to MAST, also at Culham Centre. The upgrade, which cost £45M, started in 2013 and was expected to significantly exceed MAST’s heating power, plasma current, magnetic field and pulse length.

MAST Upgrade began operation on 29 October 2020.

One of MAST Upgrade's most notable features is the Super-X divertor. The divertor removes excess heat and impurities from the plasma. Conventional divertor designs, at powerplant scale, will experience high heat loads and will need to be regularly replaced. The Super-X divertor was expected to produce heat loads that are lower by around a factor of ten and has been seen as initially successful.

In 2025 researchers announced the first use of Resonant Magnetic Perturbation coils to apply a 3D magnetic field and stabilise plasma in a spherical tokamak plasma. The technique was able to completely suppress disruptive Edge Localised Modes. In addition, they claimed to be able to independently control the plasma exhaust in the upper and lower divertors in MAST Upgrade without impacting plasma performance or density. Nitrogen injection at the plasma edge was reported to more evenly distribute energy across plasma-facing components, preventing excessive heat concentration. Also, they claimed to have set a record for injecting 3.8 megawatts into the plasma using neutral beam heating. The team also reported the best plasma shape yet, with the plasma height reaching 2.5 times its width.

=== Spherical Tokamak for Energy Production ===
The design of the next generation Spherical Tokamak for Energy Production (STEP) began in 2019 with £220 million in government funding. The plan was to begin operations in the 2040s. The current plan does not include a tritium generation facility.

== See also ==
- National Spherical Torus Experiment – US nuclear fusion reactor
- List of fusion experiments
- ELM (Edge Localized Mode) – Plasma instability at the edge of tokamak fusion devices
- Ball-pen probe – Diagnostic probe measuring plasma potential in magnetized plasmas
- Langmuir probe – Device used to measure plasma
- Resonant magnetic perturbations – Non-axisymmetric magnetic fields used to control tokamak edge instabilities
