= Small Tight Aspect Ratio Tokamak =

Nuclear fusion experiment

START
Small Tight Aspect Ratio Tokamak
- Device type: Spherical tokamak
- Location: United Kingdom
- Affiliation: Culham Centre for Fusion Energy; 51°39′32″N 1°13′42″W

History
- Year(s) of operation: 1990–1998
- Succeeded by: Mega Ampere Spherical Tokamak (MAST)

The Small Tight Aspect Ratio Tokamak (START) was a nuclear fusion experiment that used magnetic confinement to hold plasma. START was the first full-sized machine to use the spherical tokamak design, which aimed to greatly reduce the aspect ratio of the traditional tokamak design.

The experiment began at the Culham Science Centre in the United Kingdom in 1990 and was retired in 1998. It was built as a low cost design, largely using parts already available to the START team. The START experiment revolutionized the tokamak by changing the previous toroidal shape into a tighter, almost spherical, doughnut shape. The new shape increased efficiency by reducing the cost over the conventional design, while the field required to maintain a stable plasma was a factor of 10 less.

== Construction ==
The main components that comprised START included the support structure, pulse transformer, vacuum tank, toroidal and poloidal field coils, and a limiter. The support structure positioned and supported the vacuum tank which also shared the same spherical center as the large pulse transformer. The main role of the pulse transformer was to provide the current for the toroidal field coils which was supplied through fifteen iron cores that were spirally wound from a .03 millimeter iron strip. The toroidal field coil was a central conductor made of copper on the axis of the vacuum tank, and was attached to the vacuum tank through copper limbs covered by insulated clamps. START had six poloidal field coils within the vacuum tank and were encased in 3 millimeter stainless steel cases. The poloidal coils were supported from the base of the tank and each could be adjusted as necessary. The vacuum tank was the primary vessel where experiments take place; it was cylindrical in shape and was divided into three sections. The tank offered numerous ports for the attachment of pumps and diagnostics. A graphite limiter was positioned around the central stainless steel tube and this provided a simple way to measure the innermost edge of the plasma during experiments.

== Operation ==
In order to successfully heat experiments in a spherical tokamak, physicists performed neutral beam injection. This involved interjecting hydrogen into hydrogen or deuterium plasmas, providing effective heating of both ions and electrons. Although the atoms were injected with no net electrostatic charge, as the beam passed through the plasma, the atoms were ionized as they bounced off the ions already in the plasma. Consequently, because the magnetic field inside the torus was circular, these fast ions were confined to the background plasma. The background plasma slowed the confined fast ions, in a similar way to how air resistance slows down a baseball. The energy transfer from the fast ions to the plasma increased the overall plasma temperature. The neutral beam injector used in START was on loan from Oak Ridge National Laboratory.

The magneto-hydro-dynamic limit (MHD) was an operational limit of tokamaks, with START being no exception. The START team would test the MHD using forty-six sets of Mirnov coils at different heights on the center column of START. Plasmas being formed by compression within START limited the fluctuation of the MHD.

Prior to October 1995, START had no rapid terminations. In October 1995, divertor coils were installed and images showed the plasma would interact with the coils before disruptions occurred. These suspicions were further strengthened when the divertor coils were moved closer to the plasma in December 1996, which resulted in a higher frequency of disruptions.

The characteristics of plasma within START were also measured. Typical plasma within START had an aspect ratio A=1.3, elongation k=1.8, and a temperature of 400 eV.

A number of experiments reached 32 percent beta with START, where the previous world record for beta in a tokamak was 12.6 percent. Factors that contributed to the significantly higher beta number include better vacuum conditions, a more powerful neutral beam injection, a lower toroidal field, a higher plasma pressure, and a lower magnetic pressure. In 1998 a non-ohmic beta of 40% was achieved.

== Legacy ==
In March 1998, the START experiment finished and has since been disassembled and transferred to the ENEA research laboratory at Frascati, Italy, where it formed the basis of Proto-Sphera. The START team began the Mega Ampere Spherical Tokamak Experiment or MAST in 1999 which operated in the Culham Science Centre, UK until 2013. A successor experiment called MAST Upgrade began operation in 2020 at Culham.
