= Spherical Tokamak for Energy Production =

UK prototype fusion power plant programme

STEP
Spherical Tokamak for Energy Production
- Concept cross‑section of the STEP prototype
- Device type: Spherical tokamak
- Location: West Burton Power Station, Nottinghamshire, United Kingdom
- Affiliation: UK Fusion Energy Ltd.

Technical specifications
- Major radius: 4.275 m
- Minor radius: 1.9 m
- Plasma volume: 607–2192 m^{3}
- Magnetic field: 3.0 T

History
- Year(s) of operation: 2040 (planned)
- Preceded by: Mega Ampere Spherical Tokamak; MAST Upgrade
- Related devices: Mega Ampere Spherical Tokamak, Joint European Torus, ITER

Links
- Website: http://www.stepfusion.com

Spherical Tokamak for Energy Production (STEP) is a United Kingdom programme to design and build a prototype fusion power plant based on a spherical tokamak configuration. The programme is led by UK Fusion Energy Ltd., a wholly owned subsidiary of the UK Atomic Energy Authority (UKAEA) Group. STEP aims to demonstrate net electricity generation from fusion and support the development of a commercial fusion industry in the UK by around 2040. It has been described as "a Manhattan Project” in scale.

== Overview ==
STEP is intended to be the UK's first prototype fusion energy plant, designed to produce around 100 MWe of electricity and achieve tritium self‑sufficiency via breeding technologies. The programme builds on the UK's longstanding expertise in fusion research, informed by major facilities such as the Joint European Torus (JET) and the MAST Upgrade spherical tokamak.

STEP is delivered in three phases:

- Phase 1 (2019–2024): Concept design and site selection.
- Phase 2 (2025–2032): Detailed engineering design, subsystem testing and early site preparation.
- Phase 3 (2032–2040): Construction and commissioning of the prototype fusion plant.

== History of the West Burton site ==
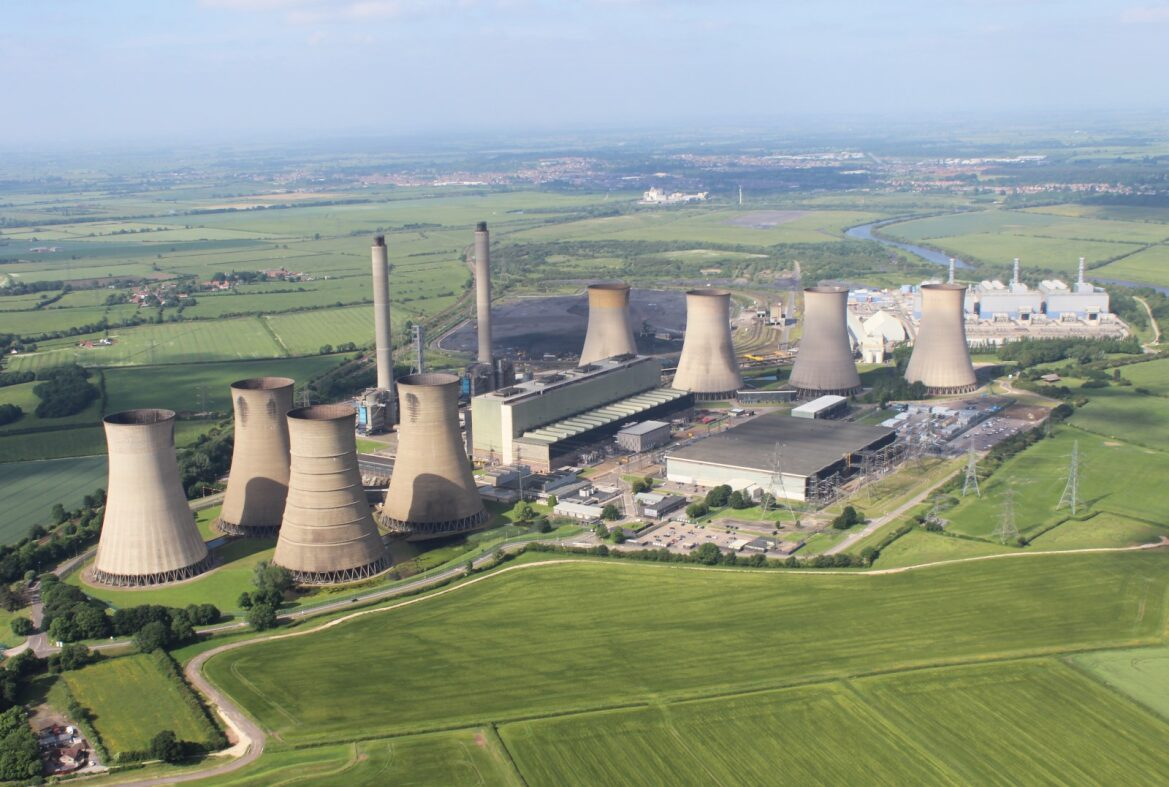
A view of the West Burton A power station site, prior to demolition works

The STEP prototype will be built at the former West Burton A coal‑fired power station in Nottinghamshire, located in the area known as “Megawatt Valley,” historically home to several major power stations. West Burton A ceased operations shortly before the site was announced as the future home of STEP.

Repurposing West Burton reflects the UK’s broader transition from coal to clean energy technologies. The UK Government highlighted that redevelopment of the site would contribute to regional economic regeneration and establish the East Midlands as a centre for advanced energy innovation.

The transformation of the site is expected to support thousands of jobs, stimulate supply chain growth and contribute significantly to local and national clean‑energy ambitions.

== Location ==
The STEP plant will be built at the former West Burton A power station site in Nottinghamshire, selected by the UK Government in 2022 following a nationwide assessment. The location benefits from long‑established grid connections, transport links and an experienced regional workforce.

STEP is also the anchor project for the emerging Trent Clean Energy Supercluster, a major regional development initiative led by the East Midlands Combined County Authority (EMCCA). The Supercluster focuses on transforming three former coal‑fired power stations—West Burton, Cottam and High Marnham—into a world‑leading clean‑energy and innovation zone.

The EMCCA Trent Supercluster strategy identifies STEP as the central driver for economic growth, skills development and inward investment, with studies highlighting the region’s potential to become a major clean‑energy innovation hub.

== Technology ==
STEP uses a spherical tokamak configuration—a compact alternative to conventional tokamaks—to confine a deuterium–tritium plasma using strong magnetic fields. Spherical tokamaks offer potential advantages in efficiency, cost and engineering design.

The plasma will be heated to over 150 million °C, enabling fusion reactions that release large amounts of energy. This heat will be transferred via heat‑exchange systems to steam turbines, producing electricity in a similar manner to existing thermal power plants.

== Programme rationale ==
Fusion energy is being developed as a safe, low‑carbon and abundant energy source. STEP aims to:

- demonstrate net energy production from fusion;
- stimulate the development of a UK fusion supply chain;
- create export and commercialisation opportunities;
- expand national capability in research, engineering and skills development.

== Governance and delivery ==
STEP is overseen by the UK Atomic Energy Authority (UKAEA) Group and delivered by its wholly owned subsidiary, UK Fusion Energy Ltd. In 2025, the UK Government announced £2.5 billion in additional investment to accelerate fusion research and support the STEP programme.

== Community engagement ==
STEP operates an extensive programme of public engagement under the brand of STEP Fusion which is intended to maintain transparency, build trust and involve local stakeholders throughout the development process. Activities include community exhibitions, drop‑in sessions, site tours and formal consultation periods, such as the first major public consultation held between January and March 2026.

Education and skills development are key priorities. STEP and UKAEA partner with schools, colleges and universities to deliver STEM outreach, careers programmes and technical training aimed at preparing a new regional workforce for future fusion industry opportunities.

Regular newsletters, media updates and public events help keep local communities informed about progress at West Burton, project milestones and future engagement opportunities. STEP presents itself as a long‑term partner committed to supporting economic and social benefits across the region.

== Research foundations ==
STEP draws on decades of UK research in plasma physics, fusion engineering, robotics, materials science and fuel‑cycle technologies. The MAST Upgrade spherical tokamak has provided significant engineering and scientific insights that inform STEP's design.

Further studies by UKAEA focus on particle confinement, magnetic stability and power‑handling challenges—critical issues for achieving a power‑producing fusion plant.

== See also ==
- UK Atomic Energy Authority
- MAST Upgrade
- Joint European Torus
- Tokamak
- Fusion power
