= 1932 in China =

- Decades: 1910s; 1920s; 1930s; 1940s; 1950s
- See also: Other events of 1932; History of China • Timeline • Years

Events in the year 1932 in China.

== Incumbents ==
- President: Lin Sen
- Premier: Sun Fo until January 28, Wang Jingwei
- Vice Premier: Chen Mingshu until January 29, Soong Tse-ven

== Events ==
- January 25 – February 4 — Defense of Harbin
- January 28 – March 3 — January 28 Incident
- February 11 — Murder of Liu Mengying
- July – ROC (as China team) competed in Olympics for the first time
- October — Ningdu Conference
- Establishment of Manchukuo

== Births ==
- January 4 — Li Ziliu, 12th Mayor of Guangzhou (d. 2022)
- January 13
  - Lee Heung-kam, Hong Kong Cantonese opera singer and TVB actress (d. 2021)
  - Joseph Zen, 6th Bishop of Hong Kong
- January 18 — Bowie Wu, Hong Kong veteran actor and director
- January 21 — Zhang Lu, singer and actress (d. 2009)
- February 4 — Zhao Zisen, engineer (d. 2022)
- February 23 — Lu Tan, astrophysicist (d. 2014)
- March 12 — Wang Mingxiu, forest geneticist and breeder (d. 2023)
- March 15 — Tang Fei, Taiwanese politician
- March 16 — Lin Shangyang, welding engineer (d. 2024)
- March 21 — Song Jiashu, materials scientist (d. 2024)
- May 22 — Li Lanqing, former Vice Premier of China
- September 3 — Peng Yigang, architect (d. 2022)
- October 8 — Liu Hulan, revolutionary (d. 1947)
- October 13 — Qiu Weiliu, oral and maxillofacial surgery specialist (d. 2024)
- October 28 — Fang Shouxian, physicist (d. 2020)
- October 30 — Li Jingwen, economist and management expert (d. 2021)
- November 4 — Xie Fei, 12th Secretary of the Guangdong Provincial Committee of the Chinese Communist Party (d. 1999)
- November 5 — Bao Tong, writer and activist (d. 2022)
- November 17 — Wang Yongzhi, aerospace engineer (d. 2024)

== Deaths ==
- February 3 — Noble Consort Yu, consort of Emperor Tongzhi of the Qing Dynasty (b. 1856)
- June 8 — Liu Tianhua, musician and composer (b. 1895)
- August 19 — Ma Fuxiang, Chinese Muslim scholar and military and political figure (b. 1876)
- September 3 — Zhang Zongchang, prominent warlord of the Fengtian clique (b. 1881)
- October 9 — Cai Shenxi, general officer in the Chinese Red Army (b. 1906)
- October 18 — Wei Baqun, revolutionary and military officer in the Chinese Red Army (b. 1894)
- November 12 — Yu Chung-han, prominent civilian politician (b. 1871)

== See also ==
- List of years in the environment
