= ICR =

ICR may refer to:

== Biology ==
- Idiopathic condylar resorption, a temporomandibular joint disorder
- Immunological constant of rejection, Immunology concept relating to tissue rejection
- Implanted cardiac resynchronization device, in cardiology
- Imprinting Control Region, genetic imprinting

== Electronics and physics ==
- Inductance (L), Capacitance (C), Resistance (R), see LCR meter and RLC circuit
- Instant centre of rotation, the point in a body undergoing planar movement that has zero velocity at a particular time
- Intelligent character recognition, advanced OCR
- Ion cyclotron resonance, a physics phenomenon in cyclotron particle acceleration

== Organizations ==
- Catholic University of Rennes (Institut catholique de Rennes), a French Catholic university
- Institute of Cancer Research, a college within the University of London
- Institute for Centrifugal Research, imaginary company created by Till Nowak as the impetus behind The Centrifuge Brain Project
- Institute of Cetacean Research, a Japanese institution
- Institute for Comparative Research in Human and Social Sciences, a Japanese institution in humanities and social sciences
- Institute for Creation Research, a creationist organization in Dallas, Texas
- Institute for Cultural Research, a London-based educational charity founded by Idries Shah
- International Care & Relief, international development charity
- International Rescue Committee, a global humanitarian, relief, and refugee-assistance non-government agency
- Iraqi Council of Representatives, a political council of Iraq
- Central Institute for Restoration (Istituto Centrale per il Restauro), art conservation institute in Rome
- Romanian Cultural Institute (Institutul Cultural Român)

== Other uses ==
- Income-contingent repayment, a payment plan based on the payer's income
- Industrial Cases Reports, a law report
- Inishowen Community Radio (ICR FM), a local radio station broadcasting on the Inishowen Peninsula in Ireland
- Intercolonial Railway, a historic Canadian railway
- Interest coverage ratio, a measure of a firm's ability to pay interest on outstanding debt
- International Civilian Representative for Kosovo, a civilian officer
- Islander Creole English, ISO 639-3 code
- Inter-City Railcar, class of 63 Irish diesel multiple units
- FAA location identifier for Winner Regional Airport, Winner, South Dakota US
