= Electron cyclotron resonance heating system =

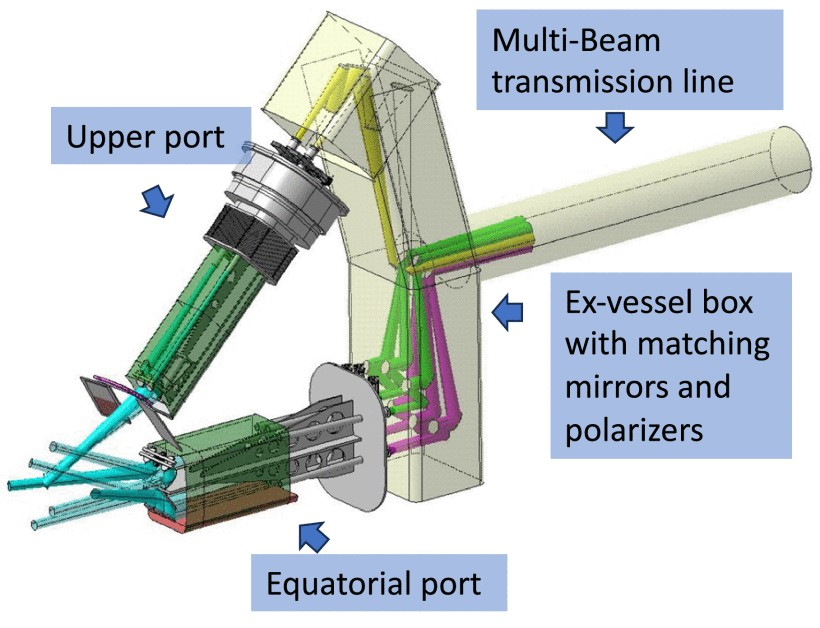
CAD representation ECRH system architecture of the equatorial and upper ports on the DTT machine. The cyan cones represent the microwave beams injected into the plasma.

An electron cyclotron resonance heating (ECRH) system is an auxiliary heating and current drive method utilized in magnetic confinement nuclear fusion devices, such as tokamaks and stellarators. This system employs electromagnetic waves at specific frequencies to transfer energy to the plasma particles, exploiting the electron cyclotron resonance physical principle, and is typically composed of three main subsystems:

- Gyrotrons, which serve as the source of high-power millimeter waves. These are vacuum electronic devices capable of generating coherent electromagnetic radiation at frequencies corresponding to the electron cyclotron resonance (typically 60–240 GHz) with power levels of several megawatts.
- A transmission line, which efficiently transports the microwave power from the gyrotrons to the vessel, using a combination of mirrors and waveguides to minimize losses.
- Launcher mirrors, which direct and focus the microwave beams into the plasma. Launchers are usually located in equatorial or upper ports of the vessel, depending on the specific heating and current drive requirements. They can be placed inside the vacuum vessel (front steering), or outside (remote steering).

== Role of ECRH ==
=== Heating and current drive ===
In a magnetic confined nuclear fusion device to reach fusion temperatures auxiliary heating methods are needed. In this regard, two main strategies have been tested: neutral injection and electromagnetic wave irradiation. Neutral injection consists in tangential shots of high-energy neutral particles towards plasma core, where they hit plasma particles, thus ionizing and getting trapped in the confinement field. In this way, they transfer their kinetic energy to the plasma, heating it up, and sustaining plasma current even when the induction effect has terminated. On the other hand, electromagnetic-wave irradiation consists in exciting plasma particles by tuning the waves on their natural frequencies. As charged particles move in a steady magnetic field, they are pushed by the Lorentz force in a helical trajectory around field lines. The frequency of revolution of such particles is called gyrofrequency, or cyclotron frequency, and for electrons it is calculated as:

$$f_{ec} = \frac{q_e B}{2\pi m_e}$$

Where:

- $q_e$ is the electron charge;
- $m_e$ is the electron mass;
- $B$ is the local magnetic field strength.

Considering the SI definitions for electron properties, this relationship can be approximated by the linear formula:

$$f_{ec} \text{ [GHz]} \approx 28 \cdot B \text{ [T]}$$

Tuning the injected electromagnetic waves to the cyclotron frequency of electrons produces a resonance-excitation effect on the helical motion of such particles, causing them to gain kinetic energy and heating the plasma. This type of auxiliary heating strategy is what is called the Electron Cyclotron Resonance Heating. Resonance heating can also be achieved tuning the injected waves to ions' cyclotron frequency (ICRH), or to the so-called lower hybrid frequency. In all cases, resonance heating allows to reach fusion temperatures and to sustain non-inductive plasma current: a fundamental requirement to achieve continuous operation.

Besides plasma heating, electron cyclotron waves can also be exploited to drive a localized non-inductive plasma current, a technique known as Electron Cyclotron Current Drive (ECCD). Unlike heating, ECCD arises from the selective acceleration of electrons moving preferentially in one direction along the magnetic field, producing an asymmetric electron velocity distribution that results in a net toroidal current.

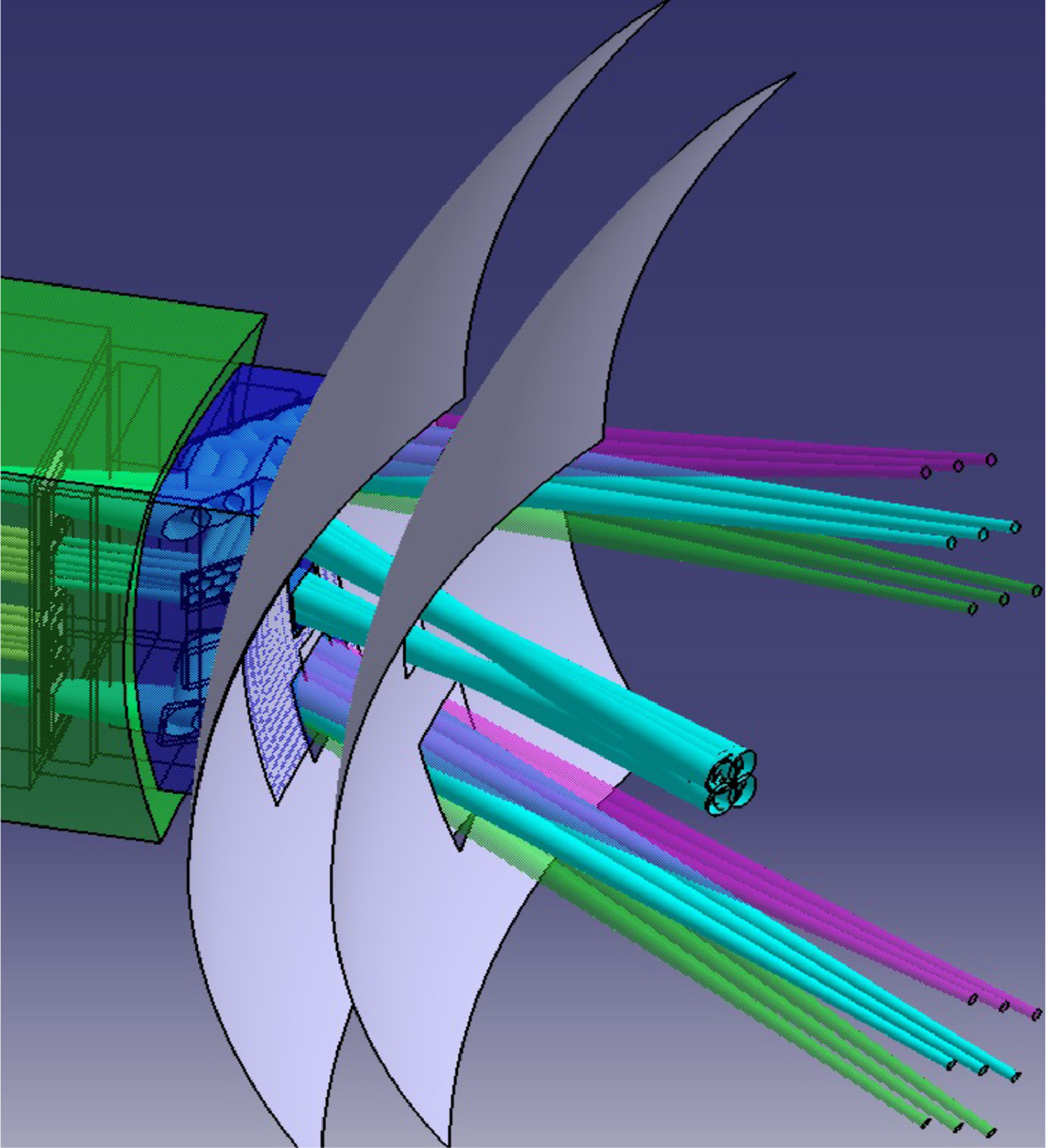
CAD representation of the layout of the launcher in the equatorial port on the EU-DEMO machine. Beam trajectories and envelopes are represented by blue, green and magenta envelopes at top and bottom for NTM control and in light blue at center for bulk heating control.

The role of ECRH differs between the two main magnetic confinement concepts. In tokamaks, where plasma confinement relies on both externally generated magnetic fields and a strong toroidal plasma current, ECRH is primarily used not only as an auxiliary heating system but also as a current-drive actuator through ECCD, making it a key tool for advanced scenario development and steady-state operation. In stellarators, by contrast, the confining magnetic field is generated entirely by external coils and does not require a large plasma current. Consequently, ECRH mainly serves as the principal plasma heating system and as a means of controlling plasma pressure, density and temperature profiles, while ECCD is generally limited to driving small currents for fine adjustments of the magnetic equilibrium or compensating residual bootstrap currents rather than sustaining confinement itself.

=== Control of plasma instabilities ===
Beyond its primary heating function, the ECRH system plays a crucial role in controlling plasma instabilities. By directing the microwave beams toward specific regions of the plasma, localized heating and current drive can be used to stabilize magnetohydrodynamic modes, in particular neoclassical tearing modes (NTM). For this purpose, the launchers are fitted with steerable mirrors allowing independent adjustment of the poloidal and toroidal angles, to get flexible beam targeting.

== System architecture and components ==
=== Power generation: Gyrotrons ===
The microwave power is generated in the form of Gaussian beams by tubular devices called gyrotrons. Modern gyrotrons can reliably produce 1 MW microwave beams up to 170 GHz for hundreds of seconds in continuous wave. Inside their tubular cavity, a beam of electrons is set into gyromotion by a strong magnetic field, typically generated by a superconducting electromagnet. The spiraling electrons resonate with the cavity to produce a microwave beam at the cyclotron frequency. The cavity is subject to high heat flux because of its small diameter, and it represents the limiting factor for the frequency and power of the output beam. Today's most advanced fusion experiments, like JT-60SA, W7-X, and planned tokamaks like DTT and ITER will feature magnetic fields up to 6 T, corresponding to an electron cyclotron frequency of about 170 GHz. However, future machines might be designed to work at higher magnetic fields thanks to High-Temperature Superconductors (HTS), to reduce machine size and costs. This trend is already in place in the US with the SPARC and ARC projects. Enabling ECRH on these machines would require gyrotrons working at much higher frequency, maybe in the range 300-400 GHz, for the same output power. Today, this is still far from reality; but research is underway to overcome the challenge.

=== Transmission line ===
The microwave beams are then propagated from gyrotrons to the reactor through a transmission line. This can be accomplished in two ways: via corrugated waveguides or quasi-optical transmission lines. A corrugated waveguide is composed of rigid corrugated tubes and miter bends, which propagate a microwave beam with low losses, typically with non-Gaussian modes. Quasi-optical transmission lines consist in a sequence of mirrors with either flat or curved surface, which iteratively re-focus and steer the propagating beam in a free space, without resorting to corrugated tubes. Both types of transmission lines can be placed in a controlled atmosphere or vacuum to increase efficiency and decrease the risk of arcs. For ECRH systems with many beams, multi-beam transmission lines (MBTLs) are used. In order to decrease the number of transmission components in MBTLs, beam summation techniques or multi-beam mirrors can be utilized. Before reaching the reactor, the beams must be suitably polarized. Polarization control is possible via steerable corrugated mirrors that can be placed inside corrugated waveguide miter bends or at the end of a quasi optical transmission line.

=== Launchers ===
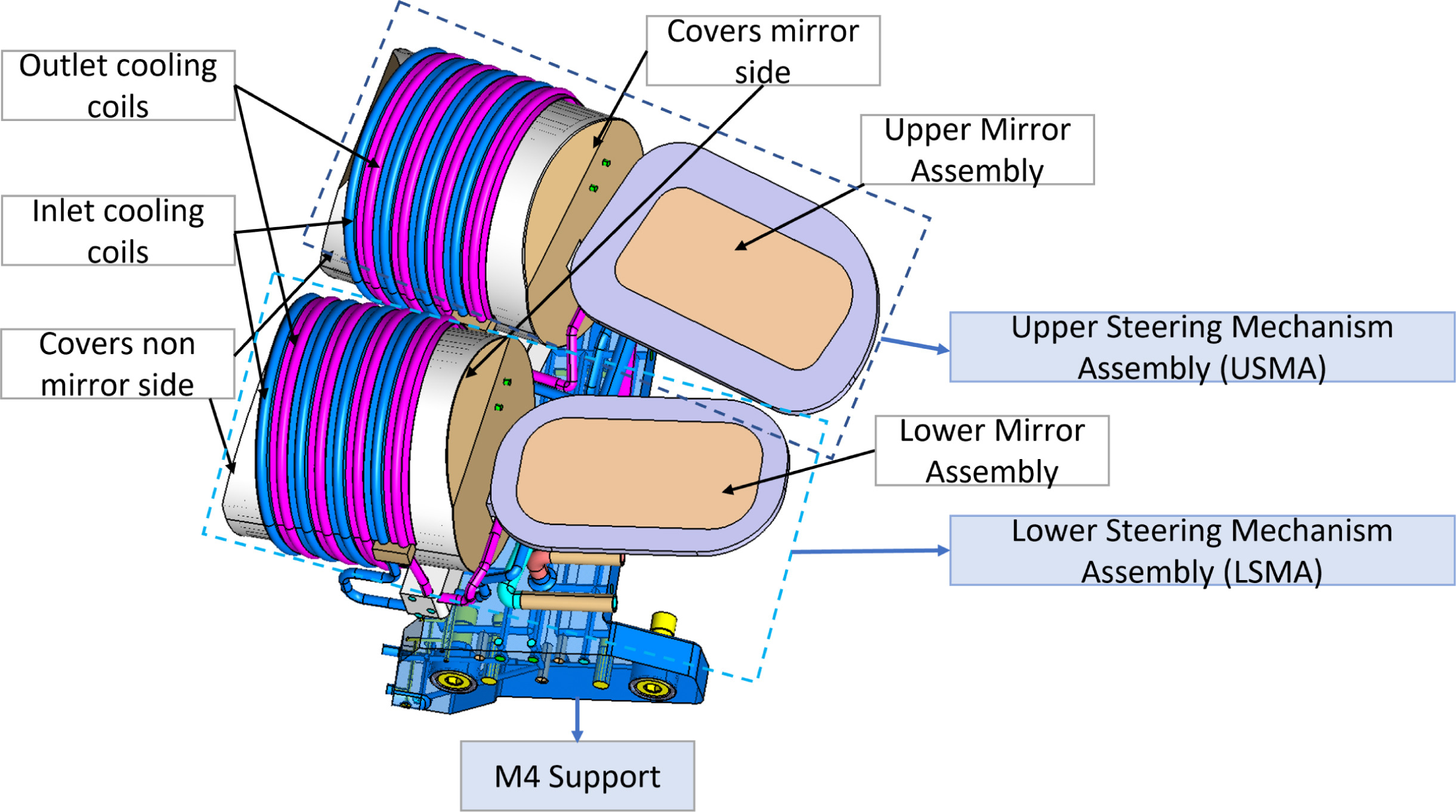
CAD representation of the steering mirrors (M4) on the ITER machine.

Once the beams enter the reactor via suitable low-loss windows and/or waveguides, they must be focused and directed into the plasma at precise and time-varying locations. This is the task of the so-called launcher, which is typically composed by a fixed focusing mirror that imposes the beam radius at the absorption location in the plasma, and a plane steering mirror that determines the injection angle. In modern machines, the steering mirror is controlled in real-time to perform various tasks, such as plasma current start-up, bulk heating, current drive, control of plasma instabilities, and even wall cleaning.

The steering mirror can directly face the plasma (front-steering, FS) or can be placed in a recessed position. FS is by far the most common approach, as it provides larger steering ranges and optimal focusing capability. The alternative concept of remote-steering (RS), where the launcher is placed outside the vacuum chamber and the beam is brought to the plasma by a waveguide, has been investigated for increased maintainability of the actuators. Despite this advantage, the lower beam-focusing capability and the narrower steering range of RS have led designers to choose the FS concept for almost all the machines, with the only exception of the hybrid approach adopted in EU-DEMO. It is particularly relevant that, after conceptual evaluation of both FS and RS alternatives, the FS concept was chosen for the ITER upper launcher due to the too strict trade-offs between available space, focusing and steering capabilities, and safety margins of the RS system. The challenges related to neutron bombardment in reactor-level machines increase the appeal of the RS approach for such devices. However, RS was discarded in the EU-DEMO project for a hybrid approach called mid-steering (MS), in which the steering mirror is inside the cryostat but behind the breeding blanket– a thick shell surrounding the vacuum vessel devoted to tritium breeding– thus benefiting from partial shielding.

== See also ==
- DTT
- Electron cyclotron resonance
- EU-DEMO
- Gaussian beam
- ITER
- Neutral beam injection
- Plasma stability
- Stellarator
- Tokamak
