= Cyclotron resonance =

Cyclotron resonance may refer to:

- Cyclotron motion - the motion of charged particles in a magnetic field
- Ion cyclotron resonance - the motion of heavy ions in a magnetic field
- Electron cyclotron resonance - the motions of electrons in a magnetic field
