= Large Helical Device =

Fusion research device

Coordinates: 35°19′34″N 137°10′07″E

LHD
Large Helical Device
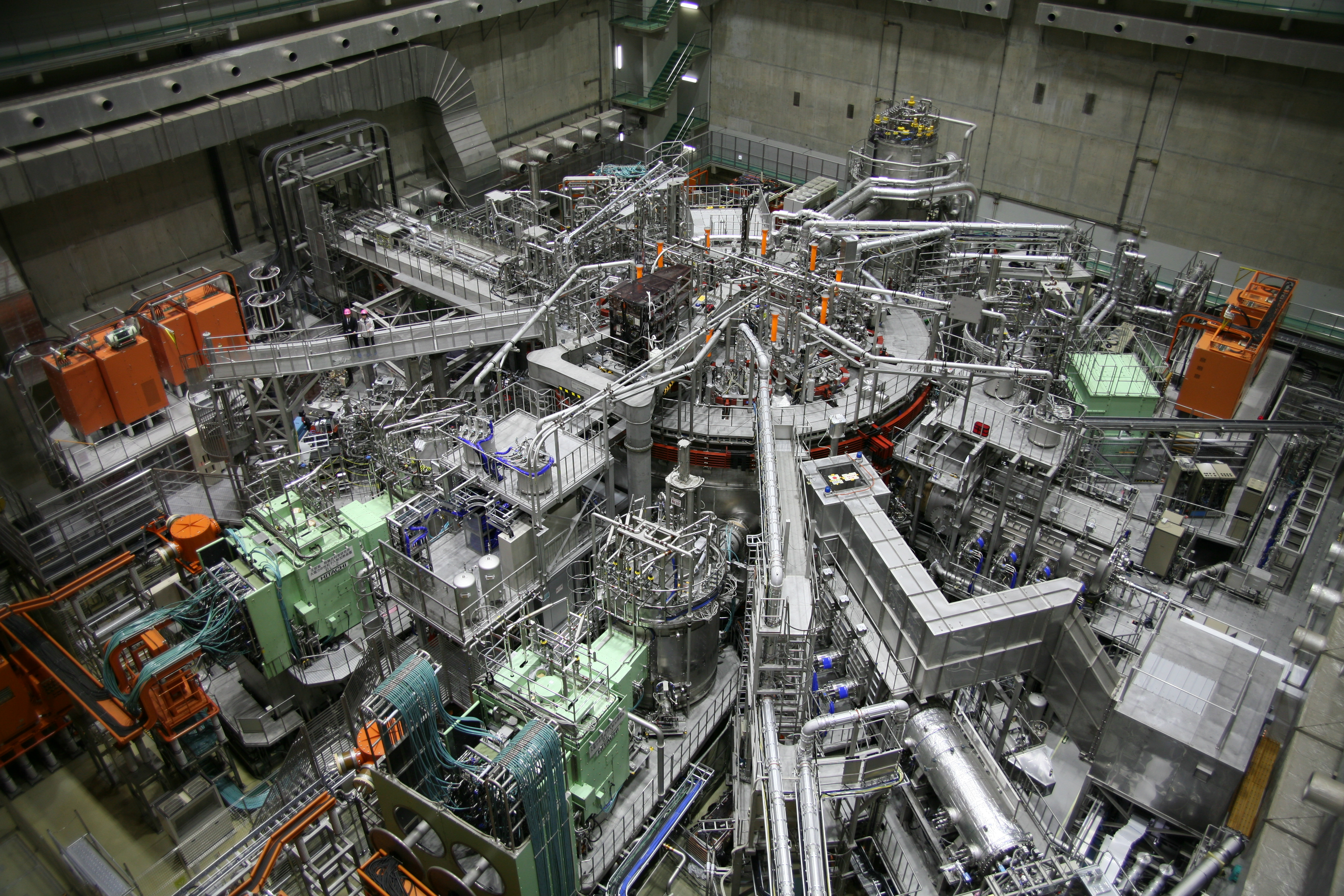
- The Large Helical Device in 2014
- Device type: Heliotron
- Location: Toki, Japan
- Affiliation: National Institute for Fusion Science

Technical specifications
- Major radius: 3.9 m (13 ft)
- Minor radius: 0.6 m (2 ft 0 in)
- Plasma volume: 30 m^{3}
- Magnetic field: 3.0 T (30,000 G)
- Discharge duration: 54 minutes
- Plasma temperature: 10 keV (120 MK)
- Plasma density: 1.2×10^{21} m^{−3}

History
- Year(s) of operation: 1998–2025

The Large Helical Device (大型ヘリカル装置, Ōgata Herikaru Sōchi) (LHD) was a fusion research device located in Toki, Gifu, Japan. It was operated by the National Institute for Fusion Science (NIFS) until 2025. The LHD employed the heliotron magnetic field configuration originally developed in Japan. It was the world's largest and most powerful superconducting stellarator. In 2015, Wendelstein 7-X began operation with equal plasma volume but a weaker magnetic field. Until that time, LHD was also the largest superconducting magnetic confinement fusion device of any kind, including tokamaks.

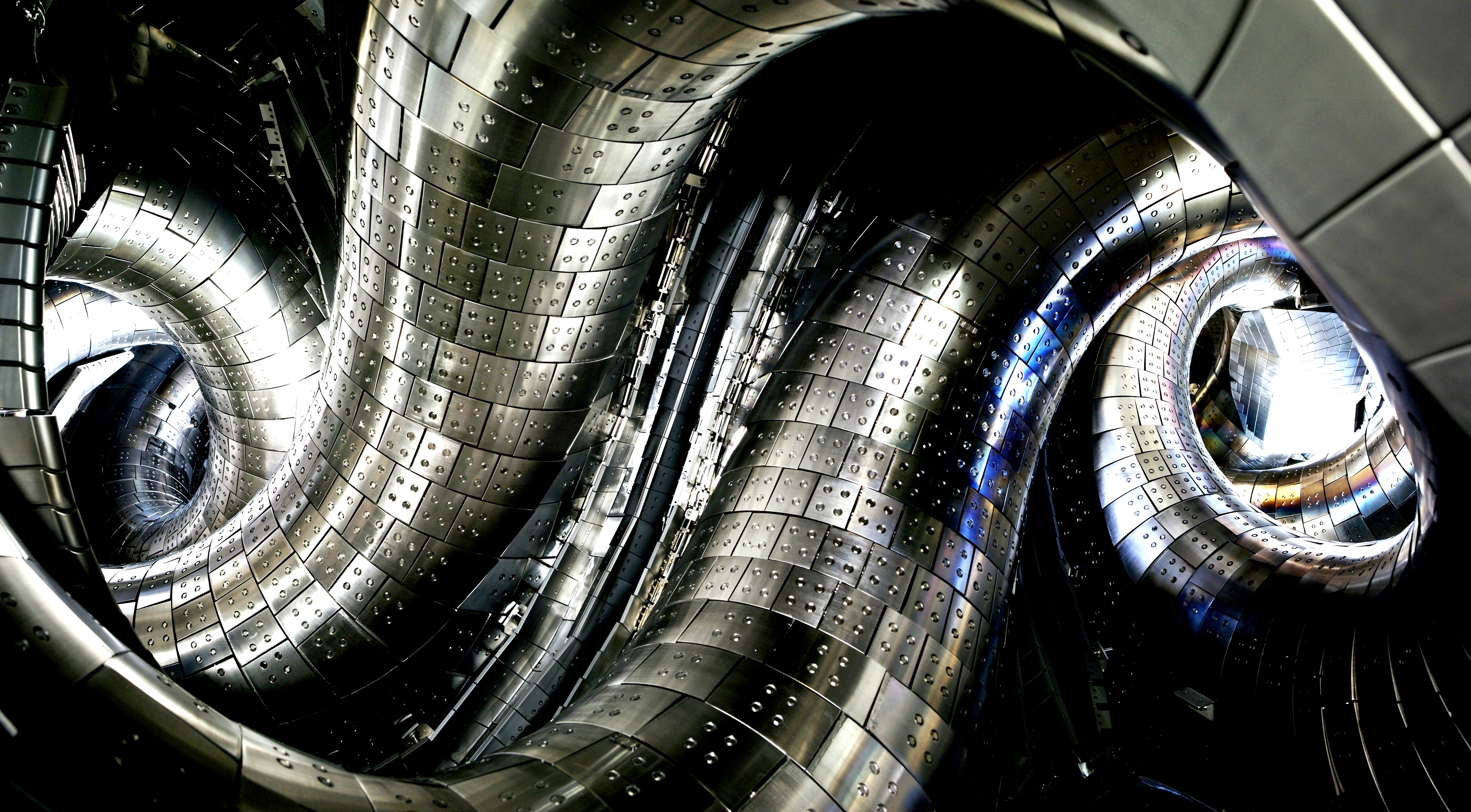
An interior view of the vacuum vessel, which shows the LHD's superconducting coils.

The objective of the project was to conduct fusion plasma confinement research in a steady state in order to elucidate possible solutions to physics and engineering problems in helical plasma reactors. LHD is of torsatron type, which means it has only two helically-winding magnetic coils. By comparison, classical stellarators such as Wendelstein 7-A have four hellically-winding coils and a full set of circular coils outside them, while modular advanced stellarators like Wendelstein 7-X have multiple (in that case 70) separate coils with complex shape and no helical symmetry. The space between the two helical windings also automatically provides a divertor. The LHD-type torsatron is therefore suggested to be particularly simple to build at scale.

The LHD used neutral beam injection, ion cyclotron radio frequency (ICRF), and electron cyclotron resonance heating (ECRH) to heat the plasma, much like tokamaks. The helical divertor heat and particle exhaust system used the large helical coils to produce a diverting field. This configuration allows for the modification of the stochastic layer size, which is positioned between the confined plasma volume and the field lines that terminate on the divertor plate. Boundary plasma research at LHD focused on the capability of the helical divertor as an exhaust system for heliotrons and stellarators.

LHD achieved the longest sustained runs of any magnetic fusion experiment, stellarator or tokamak, at 48 minutes with 1.2x10^{19}m^{-3} plasma density and 2 keV plasma temperature, and 54 minutes with 0.4x10^{19}m^{-3} plasma density and 1 keV plasma temperature.

Research into the heliotron stellarator type with the aim of generating energy from fusion continues in Japan with the company Helical Fusion, founded by NIFS scientists. The company was conditionally selected for support from the Japanese government for its fusion projects in 2026.

== History ==
- Design finalized 1987
- Start of construction 1990
- Plasma operations from 1998
- Neutral beam injection of 3 MW was used in 1999.
- In 2005 it maintained a plasma for 3,900 seconds.
- In 2006 a new helium cooler was added. Using the new cooler, by 2018 a total of 10 long term operations have been achieved, reaching a maximum power level of 11.833 kA.
- To aid public acceptance, an exhaust system was designed to catch and filter the radioactive tritium the fusion process produces.
- The Large Helical Device experiment was concluded on Christmas Day of 2025 after more than 27 years of operation.

== See also ==
- Fusion reactor
- National Institutes of Natural Sciences, Japan
