= Neutral-beam injection =

Method used to heat plasma inside a fusion device

Neutral-beam injection (NBI) is one method used to heat plasma inside a fusion device consisting in a beam of high-energy neutral particles that can enter the magnetic confinement field. When these neutral particles are ionized by collision with the plasma particles, they are kept in the plasma by the confining magnetic field and can transfer most of their energy by further collisions with the plasma. By tangential injection in the torus, neutral beams also provide momentum to the plasma and current drive, one essential feature for long pulses of burning plasmas. Neutral-beam injection is a flexible and reliable technique, which has been the main heating system on a large variety of fusion devices. To date, all NBI systems were based on positive precursor ion beams. In the 1990s there has been impressive progress in negative ion sources and accelerators with the construction of multi-megawatt negative-ion-based NBI systems at LHD (H^{0}, 180 keV) and JT-60U (D^{0}, 500 keV). The NBI designed for ITER is a substantial challenge (D^{0}, 1 MeV, 40 A) and a prototype is being constructed to optimize its performance in view of the ITER future operations. Other ways to heat plasma for nuclear fusion include RF heating, electron cyclotron resonance heating (ECRH), ion cyclotron resonance heating (ICRH), and lower hybrid resonance heating (LH).

== Mechanism ==
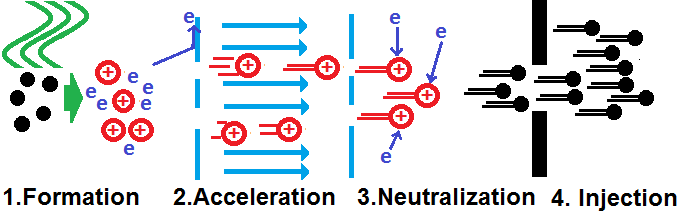
First, plasma is formed by microwaving gas. Next, the plasma is accelerated across a voltage drop. This heats the ions to fusion conditions. After this the ions are re-neutralizing. Lastly, the neutrals are injected into the machine.

This is typically done by:

1. Making a plasma. This can be done by microwaving a low-pressure gas.
2. Electrostatic ion acceleration. This is done dropping the positively charged ions towards negative plates. As the ions fall, the electric field does work on them, heating them to fusion temperatures.
3. Reneutralizing the hot plasma by adding in the opposite charge. This gives the fast-moving beam with no charge.
4. Injecting the fast-moving hot neutral beam in the machine.

It is critical to inject neutral material into plasma, because if it is charged, it can start harmful plasma instabilities. Most fusion devices inject isotopes of hydrogen, such as pure deuterium or a mix of deuterium and tritium. This material becomes part of the fusion plasma. It also transfers its energy into the existing plasma within the machine. This hot stream of material should raise the overall temperature. Although the beam has no electrostatic charge when it enters, as it passes through the plasma, the atoms are ionized. This happens because the beam bounces off ions already in the plasma.

== Neutral-beam injectors installed in fusion experiments ==
At present, all main fusion experiments use NBIs. Traditional positive-ion-based injectors (P-NBI) are installed for instance in JET and in AUG. To allow power deposition in the center of the burning plasma in larger devices, a higher neutral-beam energy is required. High-energy (>100 keV) systems require the use of negative ion technology (N-NBI).

Additional heating power [MW] installed in various fusion power experiments (* design target)
Magnetic confinement device	P-NBI	N-NBI	ECRH	ICRH	LH	Type	First operation
JET	34	—	—	10	7	Tokamak	1983
JT-60U	40	3	4	7	8	Tokamak	1985
TFTR	40	—	—	11	—	Tokamak	1982
EAST	8	—	0.5	3	4	Tokamak	2006
DIII-D	20	—	5	4	—	Tokamak	1986
AUG	20	—	6	8	—	Tokamak	1991
JT60-SA*	24	10	7	—	—	Tokamak	2020
ITER*	—	33	20	20	—	Tokamak	2026
LHD	9 (H^{+}); 20 (D^{+})	15 (H^{−}); 6 (D^{−})	?	?	?	Stellarator	1998
Wendelstein 7-X	8	—	10	?	—	Stellarator	2015

Legend

Active
In development
Retired
Active, NBI being updated and revised

== Coupling with fusion plasma ==
Because the magnetic field inside the torus is circular, these fast ions are confined to the background plasma. The confined fast ions mentioned above are slowed down by the background plasma, in a similar way to how air resistance slows down a baseball. The energy transfer from the fast ions to the plasma increases the overall plasma temperature.

It is very important that the fast ions are confined within the plasma long enough for them to deposit their energy. Magnetic fluctuations are a big problem for plasma confinement in this type of device (see plasma stability) by scrambling what were initially well-ordered magnetic fields. If the fast ions are susceptible to this type of behavior, they can escape very quickly. However, some evidence suggests that they are not susceptible.

The interaction of fast neutrals with the plasma consist of

- ionisation by collision with plasma electrons and ions,
- drift of newly created fast ions in the magnetic field,
- collisions of fast ions with plasma ions and electrons by Coulomb collisions (slow-down and scattering, thermalisation) or charge exchange collisions with background neutrals.

== Design of neutral beam systems ==
=== Beam energy ===
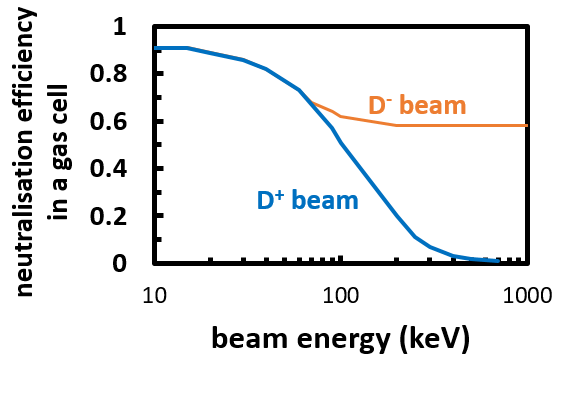
Maximum neutralisation efficiency of a fast D ion beam in a gas cell, as a function of the ion energy

The absorption length $\lambda$ for neutral beam ionization in a plasma is roughly

$$\lambda = \frac{E}{18 \cdot n \cdot M},$$

with $\lambda$ in m, particle density n in 10^{19} m^{−3}, atomic mass M in amu, particle energy E in keV. Depending on the plasma minor diameter and density, a minimum particle energy can be defined for the neutral beam, in order to deposit a sufficient power on the plasma core rather than to the plasma edge. For a fusion-relevant plasma, the required fast neutral energy gets in the range of 1 MeV. With increasing energy, it is increasingly difficult to obtain fast hydrogen atoms starting from precursor beams composed of positive ions. For that reason, recent and future heating neutral beams will be based on negative-ion beams. In the interaction with background gas, it is much easier to detach the extra electron from a negative ion (H^{−} has a binding energy of 0.75 eV and a very large cross-section for electron detachment in this energy range) rather than to attach one electron to a positive ion.

=== Charge state of the precursor ion beam ===
A neutral beam is obtained by neutralisation of a precursor ion beam, commonly accelerated in large electrostatic accelerators. The precursor beam could either be a positive-ion beam or a negative-ion beam: in order to obtain a sufficiently high current, it is produced extracting charges from a plasma discharge. However, few negative hydrogen ions are created in a hydrogen plasma discharge. In order to generate a sufficiently high negative-ion density and obtain a decent negative-ion beam current, caesium vapors are added to the plasma discharge (surface-plasma negative-ion sources). Caesium, deposited at the source walls, is an efficient electron donor; atoms and positive ions scattered at caesiated surface have a relatively high probability of being scattered as negatively charged ions. Operation of caesiated sources is complex and not so reliable. The development of alternative concepts for negative-ion beam sources is mandatory for the use of neutral beam systems in future fusion reactors.

Existing and future negative-ion-based neutral beam systems (N-NBI) are listed in the following table:

N-NBI (* design target)
	JT-60U	LHD	ITER**
Precursor ion beam	D^{−}	H^{−} / D^{−}	H^{−} / D^{−}
Max acceleration voltage (kV)	400	190	1000
Max power per installed beam (MW)	5.8	6.4	16.7
Pulse duration (s)	30 (2MW, 360kV)	128 (at 0.2MW)	3600 (at 16.7MW)

=== Ion beam neutralisation ===
Neutralisation of the precursor ion beam is commonly performed by passing the beam through a gas cell. For a precursor negative-ion beam at fusion-relevant energies, the key collisional processes are:

D^{−} + D_{2} → D^{0} + e + D_{2} (singe-electron detachment, with $\sigma$_{−10}=1.13×10^{−20} m^{2} at 1 MeV)
D^{−} + D_{2} → D^{+} + e + D_{2} (double-electron detachment, with $\sigma$_{−11}=7.22×10^{−22} m^{2} at 1 MeV)
D^{0} + D_{2} → D^{+} + e + D_{2} (reionization, with $\sigma$_{01}=3.79×10^{−21} m^{2} at 1 MeV)
D^{+} + D_{2} → D^{0} + D_{2}^{+} (charge exchange, $\sigma$_{10} negligible at 1 MeV)

Underline indicates the fast particles, while subscripts i, j of the cross-section $\sigma$_{ij} indicate the charge state of fast particle before and after collision.

Cross-sections at 1 MeV are such that, once created, a fast positive ion cannot be converted into a fast neutral, and this is the cause of the limited achievable efficiency of gas neutralisers.

The fractions of negatively charged, positively charged, and neutral particles exiting the neutraliser gas cells depend on the integrated gas density or target thickness $\tau = \int n \,dl,$ with $n$ the gas density along the beam path $l$. In the case of D^{−} beams, the maximum neutralisation yield occurs at a target thickness $\tau_{\text{D}^-, \text{1 MeV}} \approx 1.4 \cdot 10^{-16}$ m^{−2}.

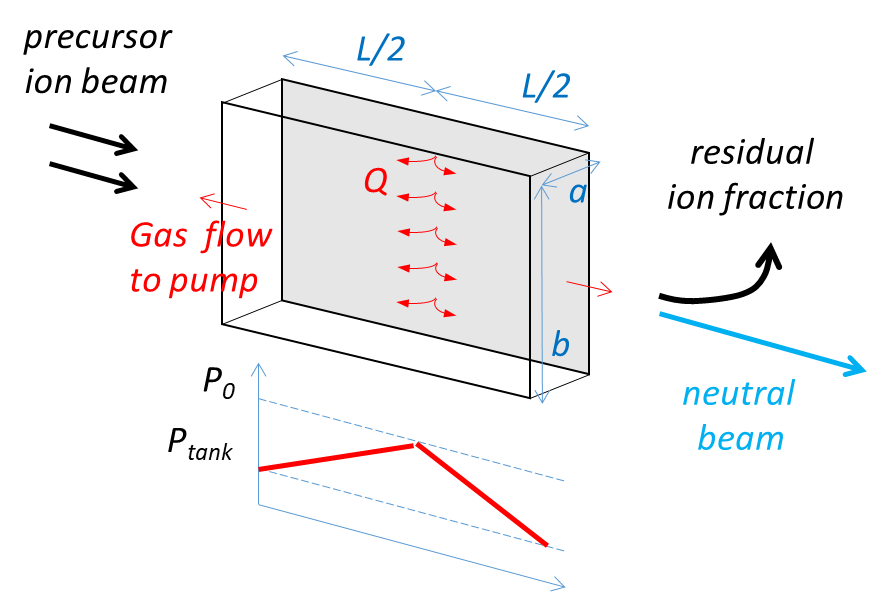
Simplified scheme of gas-cell neutraliser for neutral-beam injectors

Typically, the background gas density shall be minimised all along the beam path (i.e. within the accelerating electrodes, along the duct connecting to the fusion plasma) to minimise losses except in the neutraliser cell. Therefore, the required target thickness for neutralisation is obtained by injecting gas in a cell with two open ends. A peaked density profile is realised along the cell, when injection occurs at mid-length. For a given gas throughput $Q$ [Pa·m^{3}/s], the maximum gas pressure at the centre of the cell depends on the gas conductance $C$ [m^{3}/s]:

$$P_0 = P_\text{tank} + \frac{Q}{2C},$$

and $C$ in molecular-flow regime can be calculated as

$$C = \frac{9.7}{L/2} \sqrt{\frac{T}{m}} \frac{a^2 \cdot b^2}{a + b},$$

with the geometric parameters $L$, $a$, $b$ indicated in figure, $m$ gas molecule mass, and $T$ gas temperature.

Very high gas throughput is commonly adopted, and neutral-beam systems have custom vacuum pumps among the largest ever built, with pumping speeds in the range of million liters per second. If there are no space constraints, a large gas cell length $L$ is adopted, but this solution is unlikely in future devices due to the limited volume inside the bioshield protecting from energetic neutron flux (for instance, in the case of JT-60U the N-NBI neutraliser cell is about 15 m long, while in the ITER HNB its length is limited to 3 m).

== See also ==
- ITER Neutral Beam Test Facility
