= Condylar resorption =

- Other names: Idiopathic condylar resorption
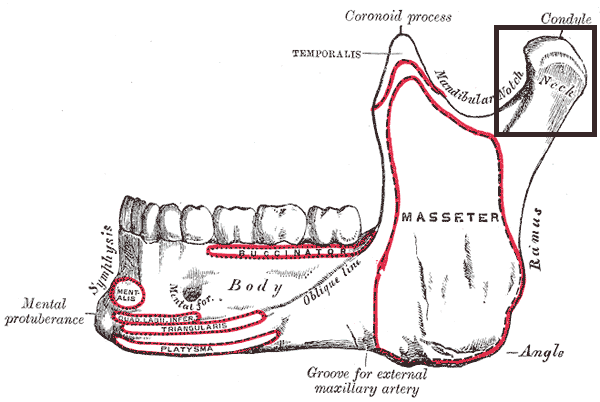
- An anatomical diagram of the condyloid process.
- Specialty: Oral and maxillofacial

Condylar resorption, also called idiopathic condylar resorption, ICR, and condylysis, is a temporomandibular joint disorder in which one or both of the mandibular condyles are broken down in a bone resorption process. This disorder is nine times more likely to be present in females than males, and is more common among teenagers.

== Symptoms and signs ==
Symptoms that may be associated with condylar resorption are both aesthetic and functional. These include:

- Occlusion
- Anterior open bite
- Receding chin
- Loss of ramus height
- Antegonial notching
- Hyperplasia of the coronoid process of the mandible
- Clicking or popping when opening or closing the jaw
- Pain when opening or closing the jaw
- Limited jaw mobility

== Causes ==
The cause of condylar resorption is unknown, but there are theories. Because condylar resorption is much more likely to occur in young females, hormonal mediation may be involved. Strain on the temporomandibular joint from orthodontics or orthognathic surgery may be related to the condition. Reactive arthritis, rheumatoid arthritis, and psoriatic arthritis are other possible causes.

== Diagnosis ==
A diagnosis of condylar resorption can be made following clinical evaluation and imaging, often cone beam computed tomography, and less frequently single-photon emission computed tomography and positron emission tomography.

== Treatments ==
Treatment of condylar resorption is controversial. Orthodontics can address malocclusion without surgery, but this is often unstable or compensatory, and fails to address the aesthetic impacts of condylar degeneration. Orthognathic surgery in conjunction with orthodontics may be done to reconstruct and stabilize the condyles and disc of the temporomandibular joint. However, this does not address the underlying etiology of the disease. Meta-analysis shows that 46-100% of idiopathic condylar resorption cases treated with orthognathic surgery experience some degree of relapse. Adverse effects of this approach also include pain, nerve damage, and loss of sensation due to the location of the inferior alveolar nerve.

Anti-inflammatory medication can be used to slow the resorption process. Arthrocentesis, and arthroscopic surgery are also sometimes used to treat disc displacement and other symptoms.

The condition can only be fully addressed with total removal of the diseased condyles. The condyles are replaced with a temporomandibular joint total joint replacement (TJR) device, often in conjunction with orthodontics and orthognathic surgery. The device restores lost ramus height, providing a stable occlusion.

== See also ==
- TMJ disorder
- Orthognathic surgery
- Condylar Hyperplasia
