= Institute for Comparative Research in Human and Social Sciences =

Institute for Comparative Research in Human and Social Sciences (ICR)
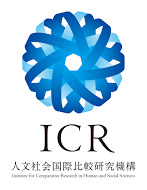
- Motto: "Transnational Innovation Through Imagination"
- Type: Public university Research Center
- Established: 2014
- Affiliations: University of Tsukuba
- President: Yutaka Tsujinaka
- Administrative staff: 7
- Location: Cooperative Research Building A406 University of Tsukuba, Cooperative Research Building A406 University of Tsukuba Tsukuba, Ibaraki, Japan
- Website: icrhs.tsukuba.ac.jp/en/

Institute for Comparative Research in Human and Social Sciences (ICR) is located in University of Tsukuba. The goal of ICR is to establish Japan as an academic force for advancing Humanities and Social Sciences, addressing global issues, and overcoming civilization clashes.

== History ==
The University of Tsukuba ICR was founded in 2014. It is the combination of Center for International, Comparative, and Advanced Japanese Studies(CAJS) and Research Center For West Asian Civilization at University of Tsukuba.

== What is ICR? ==
Comparative Research which is not confined by the framework of state, is the basic innovative idea for new Humanities and Social Sciences to tackle global issues. ICR is aiming at creating innovations where Comparative Studies of Modern Society, Foundation of Civilizations and Cultural Communication intersect. In-depth basic researches and dissemination of studies to the world will put the best mixture into practice.

== ICR Missions ==
"Transnational Innovation Through Imagination"

1. To develop transnational comparative research methods by making new ideas and methods not confined by the framework of state.
2. To seek the ways to "co-exist" for the solution of global problems, placing great value on "co-existence" with Japan's identity.
3. To establish Japan's academic position and disseminate the "innovation of the humanities and social science" to the world.

== Features of ICR ==
1. Disseminate an excellent support system for international collaborative research.
2. Place a high value on inspiration and diverse research environment.
3. Put weigh on developing human resources for the future research.
4. Originate a Japanese Style Research Innovation.
5. Become the linking base between basic researches and researches that contribute to societies.

== Organization ==
ICR consist of 3 different research divisions

1. Center for International, Comparative, and Advanced Japanese Studies(CAJS)
2. Research Center For West Asian Civilization
3. Inter Faculty Education & Research Initiative(IFERI)

== Main members ==
- Yutaka Tsujinaka – director of ICR, professor in political science, chairman of International Association Universities, special assistant of president at University of Tsukuba
- Akira Tsuneki – deputy director of ICR, professor in archaeology, Research Center For West Asian Civilization
- Saburo Aoki – deputy director of ICR, professor in literature and linguistics, head of Inter Faculty Education & Research Initiative (IFERI)

Researchers' Profile from University of Tsukuba

- Yutaka Tsujinaka
- Akira Tsuneki
- Saburo Aoki

== Publications in English ==
- Civil Society in Asia In Search of Democracy and Development in Bangladesh Edited by: Fahimul Quadir (York University, Canada) with Yutaka Tsujinaka (University of Tsukuba, Japan)

== Access ==
1-1-1 tennodai Tsukuba, Ibaraki, JAPAN.

Take the Tsukuba Express (TX)line to Tsukuba Station, then transfer to the Loop-line on-campus bus (Hidari-Mawari) to "Daigaku-koen" or Buses bound for Tsukuba Daigaku Chuo to "Daigaku-Koen"(Tsukuba Center Bus Terminal #6).

More Detailed Information & Map
