= Wang Mingxiu =

- 王明庥

President of Nanjing Forestry University
- In office 1984–1993
- Preceded by: Ma Dapu
- Succeeded by: Zhao Qiseng

Personal details
- Born: 12 March 1932 Wuhan, Hubei, China
- Died: 18 November 2023 (aged 91) Nanjing, Jiangsu, China
- Party: Chinese Communist Party
- Education: Huazhong Agricultural University; Moscow State Forestry University
- Scientific career
- Fields: Forest Tree Genetics and Breeding
- Workplaces: Nanjing Forestry University

Wang Mingxiu (Chinese: 王明庥; pinyin: Wáng Míngxiū; 12 March 1932 – 18 November 2023) was a Chinese forest geneticist and breeder and university administrator who was president of Nanjing Forestry University from 1984 to 1993, and an academician of the Chinese Academy of Engineering.

== Biography ==
Wang was born into a family of teachers, in Wuhan, Hubei, on 12 March 1932. He attended Shashi High School. He joined the Chinese Communist Party (CCP) in July 1950. He graduated from Huazhong Agricultural University majoring in forestry before gaining a vice-doctorate degree in forestry from Moscow State Forestry University.

Wang returned to China in 1961 and that year joined the faculty of Nanjing Forestry University. He moved up the ranks to become vice president in January 1982 and president in January 1984.

On 18 November 2023, he died from an illness in Nanjing, Jiangsu, at the age of 91.

== Honours and awards ==
- 1986 State Science and Technology Progress Award (First Class)
- 1994 Member of the Chinese Academy of Engineering (CAE)
- 1999 Science and Technology Progress Award of the Ho Leung Ho Lee Foundation

Educational offices
Preceded by Ma Dapu	President of Nanjing Forestry University; 1984–1993	Succeeded by Zhao Qiseng
