= Saburo Aoki =

Japanese linguist (born 1956)

- Born: 1956 (age 68–69); Tokyo, Japan
- Occupation(s): Professor of Linguistics, Semantics, French Language at Faculty of Humanity and Social Sciences at University of Tsukuba

Saburo Aoki (born 1956) is a Japanese linguist and member of the faculty of Humanities and Social Sciences at the University of Tsukuba. He specializes in French language and literature, semantics, and linguistics. His research is mainly on cross-cultural communication and comparative studies of Japanese and French. He is the deputy of the Institute for Comparative Research in Human and Social Sciences (ICR).

== Research keywords ==
- Cross-linguistic research on French and Japanese language
- Francophony study
- Dialogue between civilisations
- Global negotiation
- Research for development in Japanese language
- Culture and society

== Research projects ==
- (current) Contrastive Linguistics in French language and Japanese language
- 2012-2014 Center of Research for Development in Japanese Culture and Society
- 2011-2013 The Emerging Role of the Humanities in Our Present Changing Society

== Career history ==
- 1986-1993 University of Tsukuba Institute of Literature & Linguistics, lecturer
- 1993-2004 University of Tsukuba Institute of Literature & Linguistics, assistant professor
- 2004-2005 University of Tsukuba Graduate School of Humanities & Social Sciences, assistant professor
- 2007- (current) Inter Faculty Education & Research Initiative (IFERI) Head of Management Committee
- 2005-2011 University of Tsukuba Graduate School of Humanities & Social Sciences, Professor
- 2008-2015 Alliance for Research on North Africa (ARENA), Management Committee
- 2011- (current) Europe-East Asia Education Program for Global Development in the Humanities and Social Sciences (TRANS), Management Committee
- 2011- (current) University of Tsukuba Faculty of Humanities ＆ Social Sciences, Professor
- 2013-2014 University of Tsukuba Global Commons, Director
- 2013- (current) Institute for Comparative Research in Human and Social Sciences (ICR), Deputy
- 2014- (current) Faculty of Humanities and Social Sciences, Internationalization Promotion Office University of Tsukuba, Director

== Academic background ==
- 1979-1980 Universite Paris 7 Departement de Linguistique (Linguistics), Completed
- 1977-1979 Universite de Besançon Faculty of Literature, Graduated

== Degree ==
- 1984-12 Docteur en linguistique University of Paris 7

== Academic societies ==
- 1986 - (current) Japanese Society Of French Linguistics
- 1986 - (current) La Société Japonaise de Langue et Littérature Françaises
- 2012 - (current) The Japanese Society for Global System and Ethics
- (current) Japanese Cognitive Linguistics Association

== Major publications in English and French ==
- L'interprétation croisée d'une pratique de karaté: le conflit des fondations France/Japon, Saburo Aoki, 2013
- Cross-linguistic study of grammar - the Japanese and the French, Saburo Aoki, 1989
- La personne en japonais Junji Kawaguchi; France Dhorne; Saburo Aoki, 1995
- « Triste » d’une langue à l’autre Saburo Aoki, 2005
- Les études françaises au Japon Francine Thyrion; Jean René Klein; Saburo Aoki, 2010
