= ARC-ECRIS =

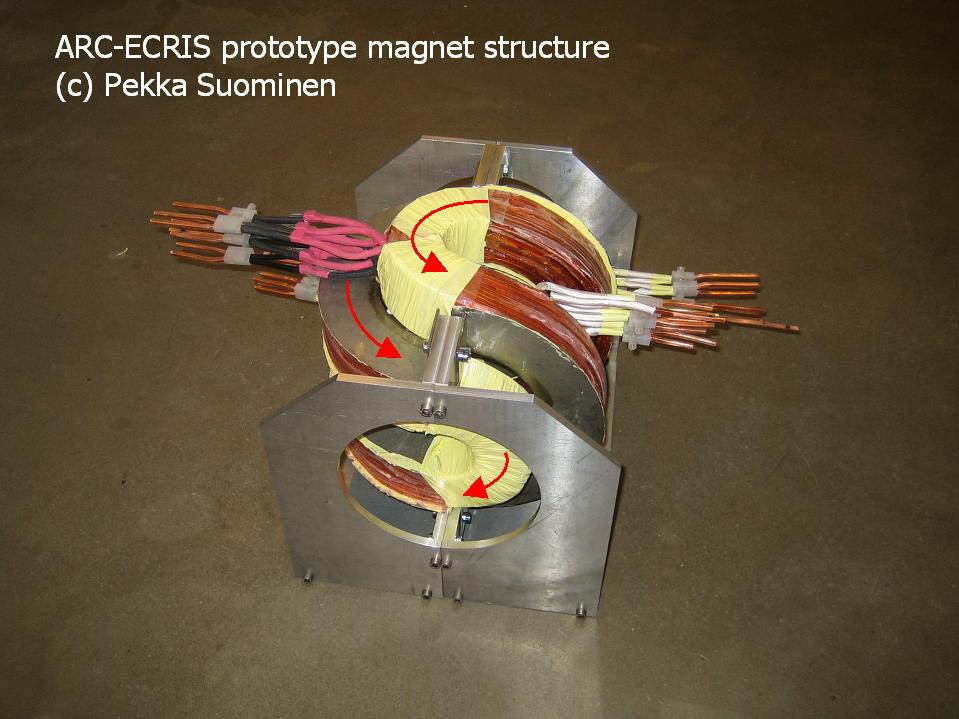
Magnet structure of the first ARC-ECRIS prototype constructed at JYFL Accelerator Laboratory

ARC-ECRIS is an Electron Cyclotron Resonance Ion Source (ECRIS) based on arc-shaped coils unlike the conventional ECRIS which bases on a multipole magnet (usually a hexapole magnet) inside a solenoid magnet.

First time the arc-shaped coils were used already in the 1960s in fusion experiments, for example at the Lawrence Livermore National Laboratory (MFTF, Baseball II, ...) and later in Japan (GAMMA10, ...).

In 2006 the JYFL ion source group designed, constructed and tested similar plasma trap to produce highly charged heavy ion beams. The first tests were promising and showed that a stable plasma can be confined in an arc-coil magnetic field structure (see references).
