= Qiu Weiliu =

Chinese engineer (1932–2024)

- 邱蔚六
- Born: 13 October 1932; Chengdu, Sichuan, China
- Died: 24 May 2024 (aged 91); Shanghai, China
- Education: West China College of Stomatology
- Scientific career
- Fields: Oral and Maxillofacial Surgery
- Workplaces: Shanghai Ninth People's Hospital, Shanghai Jiao Tong University School of Medicine

Qiu Weiliu (Chinese: 邱蔚六; pinyin: Qiū Wèiliù; 13 October 1932 – 24 May 2024) was a Chinese specialist specializing in oral and maxillofacial surgery, and an academician of the Chinese Academy of Engineering. He is hailed as "the father of plastic surgery in China" (中国整形外科之父).

== Biography ==
Qiu was born in Chengdu, Sichuan, on 13 October 1932, while his ancestral home is in Fengjie County. In 1951, he entered Sichuan Medical College (now West China College of Stomatology), where he majored in stomatology.

After graduation in 1955, Qiu was assigned as a lecturer to the Guangci Hospital affiliated with Shanghai Second Medical College (now Ruijin Hospital affiliated with Medical College, Shanghai Jiao Tong University). He moved to the Ninth People's Hospital, Shanghai Second Medical College in 1965. He served as director at the hospital for 19 years, ultimately being appointed president in 1984. He joined the Chinese Communist Party (CCP) in 1983. Qiu was a prolific researcher, and investigated oral cancer, surgery for temporomandibular joint dysfunction, and reconstructive and plastic surgery of the face. He co-authored over 400 scientific articles and was editor-in-chief of over 40 books.

On 24 May 2024, Qiu died in Shanghai, at the age of 91.

== Honours and awards ==
- 1996 State Technological Invention Award (Third Class) for the free forearm flap for soft palate reconstruction.
- 1997 State Technological Invention Award (Fourth Class) for the arthroscopic sliding mode sclerotherapy for habitual TMJ dislocation.
- December 2001 Member of the Chinese Academy of Engineering (CAE)
- 2004 Science and Technology Progress Award of the Ho Leung Ho Lee Foundation
- 2007 State Science and Technology Progress Award (Second Class) for the morphological and functional reconstruction of postoperative defects in oral and craniofacial tumors.
- 2009 Distinguished Fellow Award by the International Association of Oral and Maxillofacial Surgeons
- 2010 Title of Master by the International College of Dentists
