= ITER Neutral Beam Test Facility =

Plasma test facility

Coordinates: 45°23′26″N 11°55′40″E

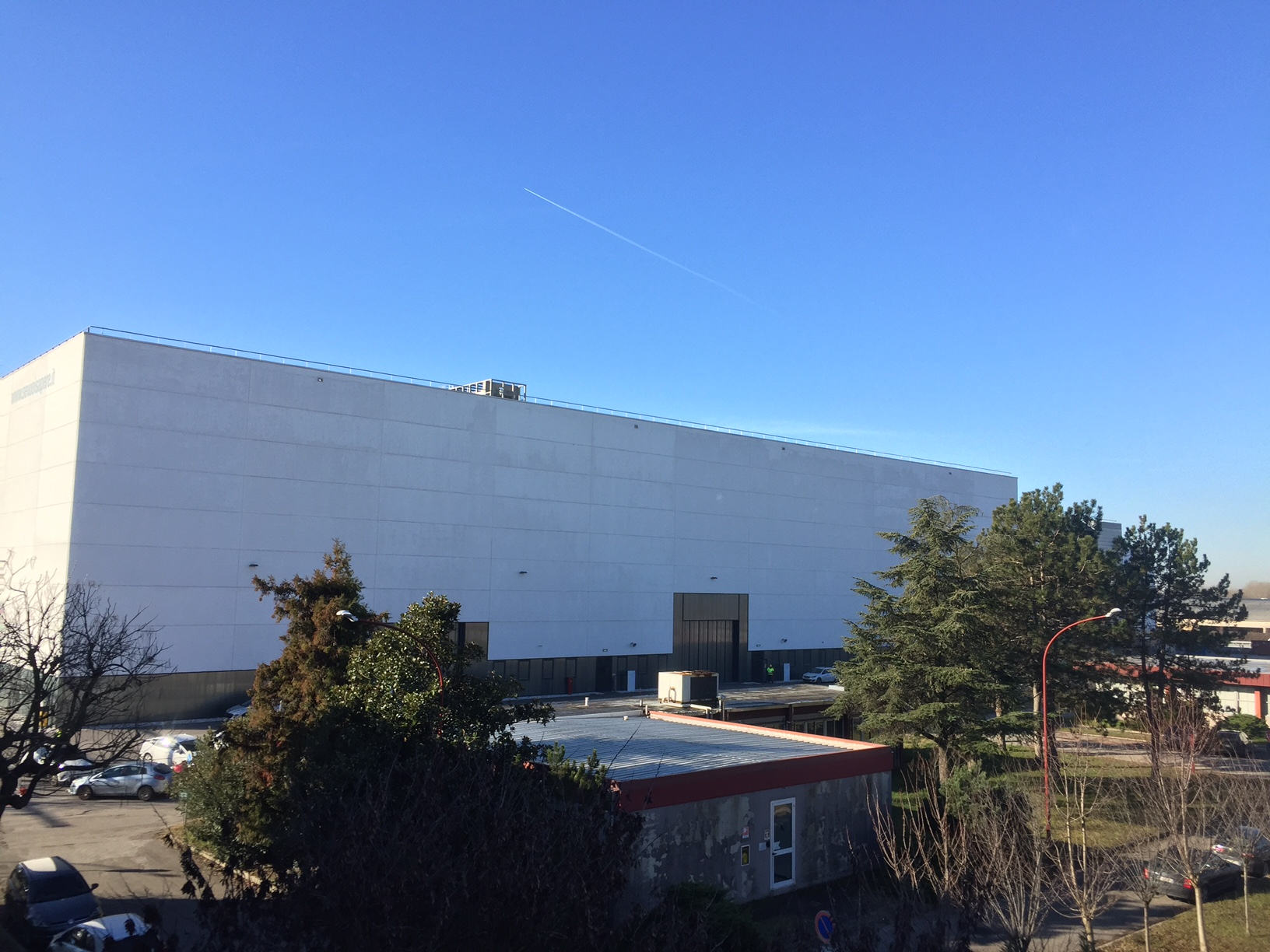
View of the Neutral Beam Test Facility

The ITER Neutral Beam Test Facility is a part of the International Thermonuclear Experimental Reactor (ITER) in Padova, Veneto, Italy. The facility will host the full-scale prototype of the reactor's neutral beam injector, MITICA (Megavolt ITer Injector & Concept Advancement), and a smaller prototype of its ion source, SPIDER (Source for the Production of Ions of Deuterium Extracted from a Radio frequency plasma). SPIDER started its operation in June 2018. SPIDER will be used to optimize the ion beam source, to optimize the use of caesium vapor, and to verify the uniformity of the extracted ion beam also during long pulses.

== ITER heating neutral beams ==
To deliver power to the fusion plasma in ITER, two heating neutral beam injectors will be installed. They are designed to provide the power of 17 MW each, through the 23 m beamlines, up to the four-meter diameter container: in order to deposit sufficient heating power in the plasma core instead of the plasma edges, the beam particle energy shall be about 1 MeV, thus increasing the neutral beam system complexity to an unprecedented level. This will be the main auxiliary heating system of the reactor. Due to its low conversion efficiency, the neutral beam injector first needs to start a precursor negative ion beam of 40 A, and then neutralizes it by passing it through a gas cell (with an efficiency < 60%), and then by a residual ion dump (the remaining 40—20% negative, 20% positive). The neutralized beam is then dumped on a calorimeter during conditioning phases, or coupled with the plasma. Further reionization losses or interception with the mechanical components reduce its current to 17 A.

== Purposes ==
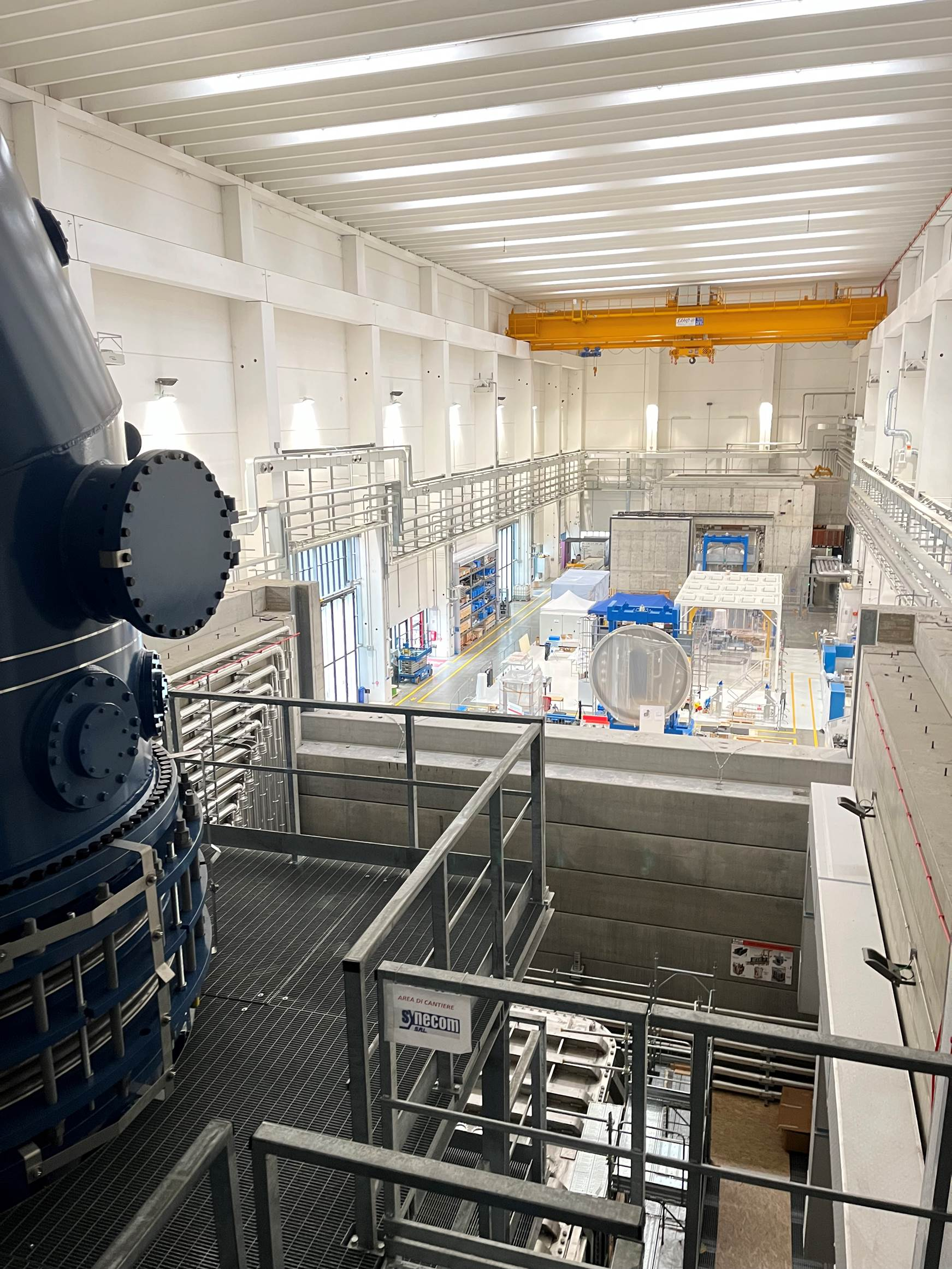
Inside view of the neutral beam test facility; picture taken from the top of MITICA bioshield, during the maintenance of SPIDER (reassembly of SPIDER ongoing in the working area at the center of the picture)

The role of the test facility includes research and development on the following topics:

- voltage holding: due to neutron environment, this will be the first beam source at -1 MV with vacuum insulation instead of gas insulation (SF_{6} gas is typically used);
- negative ion formation: the requirement on the extracted current density from the cesiated ion source is at the limit of the present technology of plasma ion sources.
- beam optics: the precursor ion beam is generated in a multigrid electrostatic accelerator, having 1280 apertures in each of the 7 grids composing it. Since the overall width of the beam along the beam drift (about 25 m) is due to the optics of each of the 1280 beamlets, the grid alignment and the disturbances produced by magnetic fields and electrostatic error fields are to be carefully verified.
- vacuum pumps: two 8 m long, 1.6 m high cryopumps will be installed on each side of the vacuum vessel. The fatigue life of components operating with cycles between 4 K and 400 K is to be verified.
- heat load on mechanical components: on the electrodes used for beam acceleration, and along the beam path, mechanical components are subject to very high thermal loads. These loads are continuously applied during long pulses, up to 1 h. These loads are anyhow lower than the heat loads expected on the ITER divertor plates.

== Prototypes at the NBTF ==
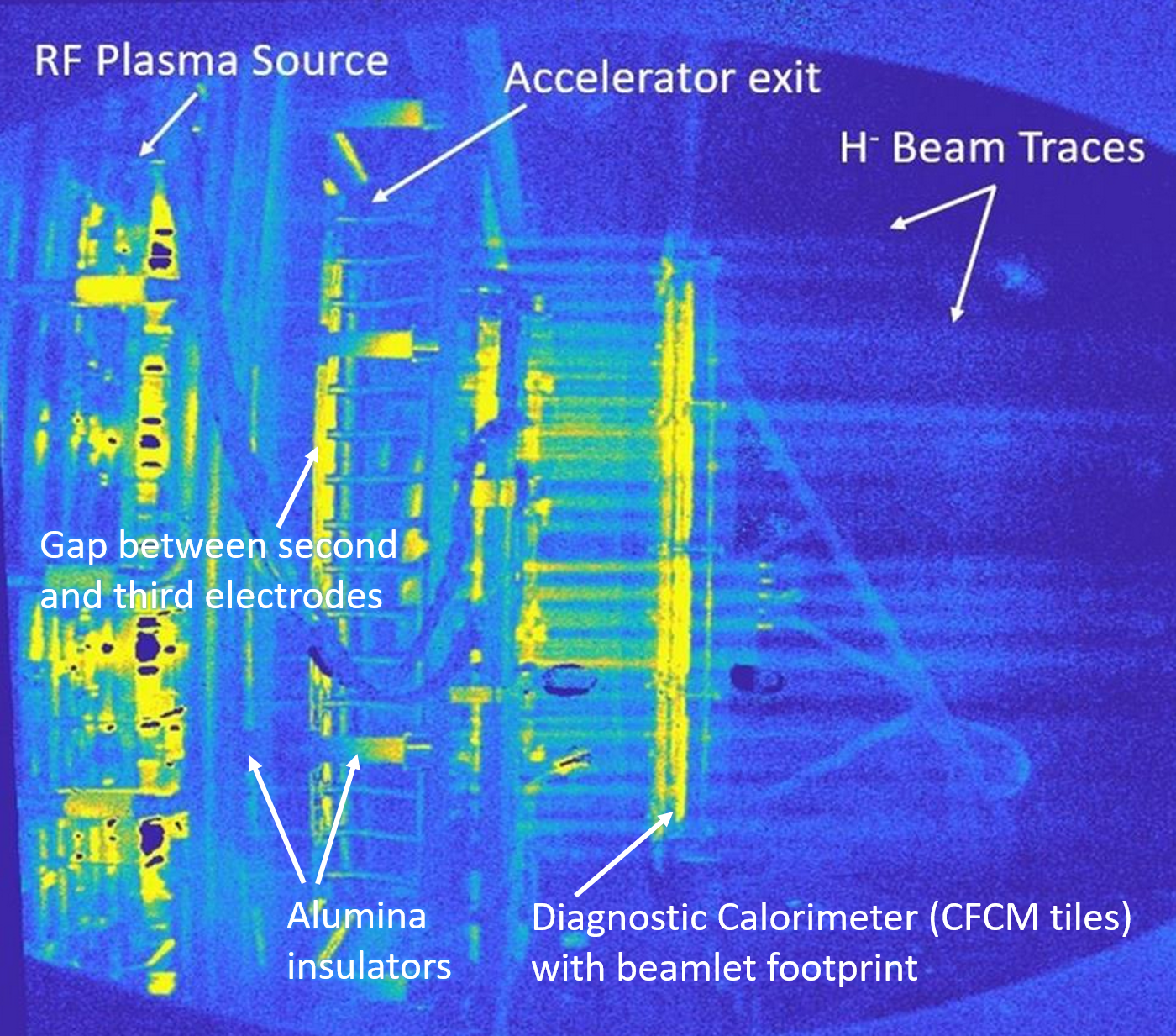
Negative ion extraction with reduced number of beamlets, in early volume operation of SPIDER (May/June 2019)

SPIDER is the first large experimental devices to start the operation at the test facility (May 2018). The components of MITICA are currently under procurement, with its first operation expected in late 2023.

=== SPIDER ===
The design parameters of SPIDER are the following:

- Type: caesiated surface-plasma negative ion source
- Plasma source: 8 cylindrical RF drivers, operated at 1 MHz, connected to a single 0.8 m × 1.6 m × 0.25 m expansion chamber
- Process gas: hydrogen or deuterium
- Extracted hydrogen negative ion beam current: 54 A (target value)
- Electrodes and nominal voltages: Plasma Grid (-110 kV), Extraction Grid (-100 kV), Grounded Grid (0 V)
- Number of beamlets and multi-beamlet beam pattern: 1280 beamlets separated into 4 × 4 beamlet groups of 5 × 16 beamlets each

During 2018, the plasma discharge by eight ion source RF drivers were optimised. In 2019 the operation with hydrogen negative ion beam begun: for the first year, SPIDER will operate with a reduced number of beamlets (80 instead of 1280) due to limitations in the vacuum system. In 2021, the first operation with caesium was performed.

=== Capabilities ===
The capabilities of SPIDER and MITICA are listed in the following table in comparison with the objectives of the ITER Heating Neutral Beam and with other existing devices based on RF-driven sources. The obtained results reported in table refers to the operation at low filling pressure of 0.3 Pa; a marked improvement of performances is found for higher operating pressures, but a low pressure is required to minimise the heat loads due to stray particles, generated by interaction of the beam ions with the background gas along the multi-grid electrostatic accelerator of MITICA and ITER HNB sources.

Experiment	First operation	Beam energy (achieved/ target)	negative ion beam current (achieved/ target)	negative ion beam current density (achieved/ target)	Ion source type	Accelerator type	Neutraliser type	Beamline length	Neutral beam equivalent current	Target single beamlet divergence at 0.3 Pa (gaussian 1/e)	Achieved single beamlet divergence at 0.3 Pa ±10% (gaussian 1/e)
BATMAN Upgrade	upgraded in 2018	~60 kV	? (hydrogen)	350 A/m^{2}/ 330 A/m^{2} (hydrogen)	RF-driven caesiated surface-plasma source	Multi-aperture electrostatic triode	-	~3 m	-	-	11 mrad (core divergence including ~75% beamlet current)
ELISE	Feb 2013	~60 kV	~27 A (hydrogen)	~280 A/m^{2} / 330 A/m^{2} (hydrogen)	RF-driven caesiated surface-plasma source	Multi-aperture electrostatic triode	-	~5 m	-	-	-
SPIDER	May 2018	50 kV/ 110 kV	~1 A/ 54 A (hydrogen)	225 A/m^{2} / 330 A/m^{2} (hydrogen)	RF-driven caesiated surface-plasma source	Multi-aperture electrostatic triode	-	~5 m	-	<7 mrad	12 mrad
MITICA	2025 (expected)	880 kV (hydrogen) / 1000 kV (deuterium)	-/ 40 A (hydrogen)	-/ 330 A/m^{2} (hydrogen)	RF-driven caesiated surface-plasma source	Multi-grid multi-aperture concept (7 electrodes)	4 Gas cells	~13 m	16.7 A	<7 mrad	-
ITER HNB	TBD	880 kV (hydrogen) / 1000 kV (deuterium)	40 A	-/ 330 A/m^{2} (hydrogen)	RF-driven caesiated surface-plasma source	Multi-grid multi-aperture concept (7 electrodes)	4 Gas cells	~22.5 m	16.7 A	<7 mrad	-

== See also ==
- Neutral beam injection
- ITER
