= Lin Shangyang =

Chinese engineer (1932–2024)

- 林尚扬
- Born: 16 March 1932; Siming County, Fujian, China
- Died: 20 July 2024 (aged 92); Suzhou, Jiangsu, China
- Education: Harbin Institute of Technology
- Scientific career
- Fields: Welding
- Workplaces: Harbin Welding Institute

Chinese name
- Simplified Chinese: 林尚扬
- Traditional Chinese: 林尚揚
Transcriptions
Standard Mandarin
- Hanyu Pinyin: Lín Shàngyáng

Lin Shangyang (Chinese: 林尚扬; 16 March 1932 – 20 July 2024) was a Chinese welding engineer, and an academician of the Chinese Academy of Engineering.

== Biography ==
Lin was born in Siming County (now Xiamen), Fujian, on 16 March 1932. He enlisted in the People's Liberation Army (PLA) in June 1951, and served until June 1955. In September 1956, he was accepted to Harbin Institute of Technology, where he majored in welding process and equipment.

After graduation in 1961, Lin was despatched to the Institute of New Technical Physics, Heilongjiang Branch of the Chinese Academy of Sciences. In January 1978, he moved to Harbin Welding Institute, where he was promoted to deputy chief engineer in January 1982 and director of the Technical Committee in January 1995. He joined the Chinese Communist Party (CCP) in March 1981.

On 20 July 2024, Lin died in Suzhou, Jiangsu, at the age of 92.

== Honours and awards ==
- 1980 State Technological Invention Award (Third Class)
- 1990 State Technological Invention Award (Third Class)
- 1992 State Science and Technology Progress Award (Second Class)
- 1995 State Science and Technology Progress Award (Third Class)
- May 1995 Member of the Chinese Academy of Engineering (CAE)
