= Zhao Zisen =

Chinese engineer (1932–2022)

- 赵梓森
- Born: 4 February 1932; Shanghai, China
- Died: 15 December 2022 (aged 90); Wuhan, Hubei, China
- Education: Zhejiang University; Utopia University; Chiao Tung University
- Scientific career
- Fields: Optical fiber communications
- Workplaces: Research Institute of Wuhan Academy of Posts and Telecommunications

Chinese name
- Simplified Chinese: 赵梓森
- Traditional Chinese: 趙梓森
Transcriptions
Standard Mandarin
- Hanyu Pinyin: Zhào Zǐsēn

Zhao Zisen (Chinese: 赵梓森; 4 February 1932 – 15 December 2022) was a Chinese engineer, and an academician of the Chinese Academy of Engineering. He is noted for developing the first practical optical fiber in China in 1977, and has been hailed as the "Father of Optical Fiber in China".

Zhao was a delegate to the 6th, 7th, and 8th National People's Congress. He was a representative of the 16th National Congress of the Chinese Communist Party.

== Biography ==
Zhao was born in today's Luwan District of Shanghai, on 4 February 1932, while his ancestral home is in Zhongshan, Guangdong. His father was a shop assistant in a department store, and his mother was a salesperson. In 1937, the Battle of Shanghai broke out, soon the Imperial Japanese Army occupied Shanghai, they had to relocate to the British Concession. He graduated from Zhejiang University, Utopia University, and Chiao Tung University.

After university in 1953, he became an intern in Nanjing Telecom Bureau and then Shenyang Telecom Bureau. He taught at Wuhan Telecommunication School in 1954 and then to Wuhan College of Posts and Telecommunications in 1958. In 1970, he became an engineer at the 528th Factory of the Ministry of Posts and Telecommunications, where he worked for four years. He joined the Research Institute of Wuhan Academy of Posts and Telecommunications in 1974, becoming chief engineer in 1983 and vice president in 1987.

On 15 December 2022, he died in Wuhan, Hubei, at the age of 90.

== Personal life ==
Zhao married Fan Youying (范幼英), who was a senior engineer at the Research Institute of Wuhan Academy of Posts and Telecommunications.

== Publication ==
- 光纤通信工程 [Optical Fiber Communication Engineering] (in Chinese). Beijing: Posts and Telecommunications Press. 1994. ISBN 9787115051165.

== Honours and awards ==
- 1985 State Science and Technology Progress Award (Second Class) for the optical cable communication system
- 1995 Member of the Chinese Academy of Engineering (CAE)
- 2005 State Science and Technology Progress Award (Second Class)
