= Ion cyclotron resonance =

Ion cyclotron resonance is a phenomenon related to the movement of ions in a magnetic field. It is used for accelerating ions in a cyclotron, and for measuring the masses of an ionized analyte in mass spectrometry, particularly with Fourier transform ion cyclotron resonance mass spectrometers. It can also be used to follow the kinetics of chemical reactions in a dilute gas mixture, provided these involve charged species.

== Definition of the resonant frequency ==
An ion in a static and uniform magnetic field will move in a circle due to the Lorentz force. The angular frequency of this cyclotron motion for a given magnetic field strength B is given by

$$\omega = 2\pi f = \frac{zeB}{m},$$

where z is the number of positive or negative charges of the ion, e is the elementary charge and m is the mass of the ion. An electric excitation signal having a frequency f will therefore resonate with ions having a mass-to-charge ratio m/z given by

$$\frac{m}{z} = \frac{eB}{2\pi f}.$$

The circular motion may be superimposed with a uniform axial motion, resulting in a helix, or with a uniform motion perpendicular to the field (e.g., in the presence of an electrical or gravitational field) resulting in a cycloid.

== Ion cyclotron resonance heating ==
Ion cyclotron resonance heating (or ICRH) is a technique in which electromagnetic waves with frequencies corresponding to the ion cyclotron frequency is used to heat up a plasma. The ions in the plasma absorb the electromagnetic radiation and as a result of this, increase in kinetic energy. This technique is commonly used in the heating of tokamak plasmas.

=== In the solar wind ===
On March 8, 2013, NASA released an article according to which ion cyclotron waves were identified by its solar probe spacecraft called WIND as the main cause for the heating of the solar wind as it rises from the Sun's surface. Before this discovery, it was unclear why the solar wind particles would heat up instead of cool down, when speeding away from the Sun's surface.

=== Magnetic confinement fusion ===
In fusion devices, such as tokamaks and stellarators, ICRH antennas are installed in the machine vessel to heat the plasma using radio waves with frequencies in the range of the ion cyclotron resonance.

ICRH provides localized heating of ions in fusion plasmas, which can generate a large population of energetic particles typically inaccessible with other heating methods (such as electron cyclotron resonance heating or neutral beam injection). The confinement properties of fast ions in plasma is a major research topic in fusion plasma physics.

== See also ==
- Cyclotron resonance (disambiguation)
- Electron cyclotron resonance
