= Peng Yigang =

Chinese architect (1932–2022)

- 彭一刚
- Born: 3 September 1932; Hefei, Anhui, China
- Died: 23 October 2022 (aged 90); Tianjin, China
- Education: Tianjin University
- Scientific career
- Fields: Architecture
- Workplaces: Tianjin University

Chinese name
- Simplified Chinese: 彭一刚
- Traditional Chinese: 彭一剛
Transcriptions
Standard Mandarin
- Hanyu Pinyin: Péng Yīgāng

Peng Yigang (Chinese: 彭一刚; 3 September 1932 – 23 October 2022) was a Chinese architect, and an academician of the Chinese Academy of Sciences.

He was a member of the 10th Central Committee of the China Democratic League. He was a member of the 8th and 9th National Committee of the Chinese People's Political Consultative Conference.

== Biography ==
Peng was born in Hefei, Anhui, on 3 September 1932. His family relocated to Lihuang County (now Jinzhai County) due to the Second Sino-Japanese War, where he attended Gaoqi Primary School and the Private Zhongzheng Middle School. After graduating from Hefei High School in 1950, he was admitted to Tangshan Institute of Technology, Northern Jiaotong University (now Southwest Jiaotong University). During the national reorganization of colleges and departments in the year 1952, he became a student of Beijing Railway College (now Beijing Jiaotong University) and then Tianjin University.

After university in 1953, Peng taught at Tianjin University, where he was promoted to full professor in 1983 and to doctoral supervisor in 1986. He joined the China Democratic League in November 1987.

On 23 October 2022, he died from an illness in Tianjin, at the age of 90.

== Works ==
The main buildings designed by Peng include the Architecture Hall of Tianjin University, Wang Xuezhong Art Research Institute (王学仲艺术研究所), Tianjin Water Park Panda House, Pingdu Park, Liugong Island Memorial Hall, and London Chinatown.

== Publications ==
- 创意与表现 [Creativity and Performance] (in Chinese). Harbin, Heilongjiang: Heilongjiang Science and Technology Press. 1994. ISBN 9787538829464.
- 感悟与探寻：1994–1999建筑创作 绘画 论文集 [Comprehension and Exploration: 1994–1999 Collection of Architectural Creation, Painting and Essays] (in Chinese). Tianjin: Tianjin University Press. 2000. ISBN 9787561812983.
- 中国古典园林分析 [Analysis of the Traditional Chinese Garden] (in Chinese). Beijing: China Architecture & Building Press. 2008. ISBN 9787112003600.
- 建筑空间组合论 [On the Combination of Architectural Space] (in Chinese). Beijing: China Architecture & Building Press. 2008. ISBN 9787112100323.
- 建筑师笔下的人物素描 [Portrait Sketches Written by Architects] (in Chinese). Beijing: China Architecture & Building Press. 2009. ISBN 9787112105243.
- 建筑绘画及表现图 [Architectural Drawing and Performance Plans] (in Chinese). Beijing: China Architecture & Building Press. 2010. ISBN 9787112034819.
- 彭一刚文集 [Collected Works of Peng Yigang] (in Chinese). Wuhan, Hubei: Huazhong University of Science and Technology Press. 2010. ISBN 9787560960562.
- 学术生涯之外的老有所乐 [Old People Enjoy Themselves beyond Their Academic Career] (in Chinese). Beijing: China Architecture & Building Press. 2015. ISBN 9787112181100.
- 传统村镇聚落景观分析 [Analysis on the Landscape of Traditional Villages and Towns] (in Chinese). Beijing: China Architecture & Building Press. 2018. ISBN 9787112211111.
- 画意中的建筑：彭一刚手绘建筑表现图集 [Painted Architecture: Peng Yigang's Hand-painted Architectural Performance Atlas] (in Chinese). Wuhan, Hubei: Huazhong University of Science and Technology Press. 2019. ISBN 9787568035880.

== Honours and awards ==
- October 1995 Member of the Chinese Academy of Sciences (CAS)
