= Nanjing Forestry University =

Public university in Nanjing, Jiangsu, China

- 南京林业大学
- Motto: 诚朴雄伟,树木树人
- Type: Public
- Established: Sanjiang Normal College, 1902; 124 years ago. Nanjing Forestry College, 1952; 74 years ago. Nanjing Technological College of Forest Products, 1972; 54 years ago. Nanjing Forestry College, 1983; 43 years ago. Nanjing Forestry University, 1985; 41 years ago.
- President: Fuliang Cao (曹福亮)
- Academic staff: 1,200
- Undergraduates: 30,000
- Postgraduates: 4,500
- Location: Nanjing, Jiangsu, China; 32°04′51″N 118°48′41″E
- Campus: Urban: Xuan'wu campus Suburban: Huai'an campus
- Colours: NFU-Green
- Nickname: 南林 南林大 NFU NJFU
- Website: www.njfu.edu.cn (in Chinese) eng.njfu.edu.cn (in English)

Nanjing Forestry University
- Simplified Chinese: 南京林业大学
- Traditional Chinese: 南京林業大學
Transcriptions
Standard Mandarin
- Hanyu Pinyin: Nánjīng Línyè Dàxué

Nanjing Forestry University (NJFU; 南京林业大学) is a provincial public university in Nanjing, Jiangsu, China. Affiliated with the Province of Jiangsu, the university is part of the Double First-Class Construction.

== History ==
The origin of the university can be traced back to the Forest Departments of Jinling University and Central University. In 1952, Nanjing Forestry College was established after the merger of the Forest Departments from Wuhan University, Nanchang University, and Hubei Agricultural College. It was renamed Nanjing Technological College of Forest Products in 1972. It adopted the current name in 1985.

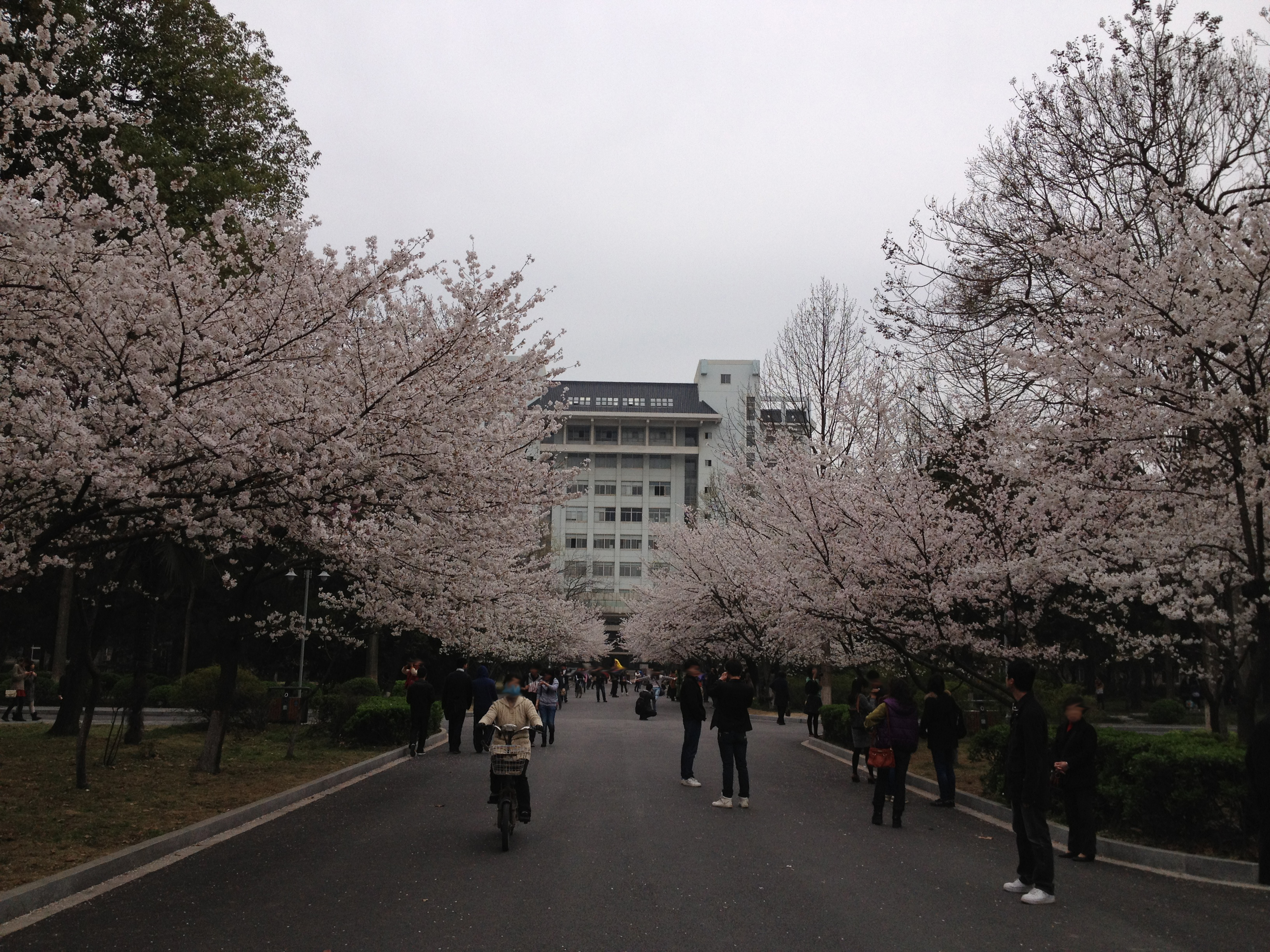
Cherry Blossom Avenue
