= Lu Tan =

Chinese astrophysicist

Lu Tan (Chinese: 陆埮; February 23, 1932 – December 3, 2014) was a Chinese astrophysicist, who was a member of the Chinese Academy of Sciences.
