= Tearing mode =

Plasma instability

In plasma physics, a tearing mode is a plasma instability characterized by field line reconnection and the formation of magnetic islands. With islands emerging in the plasma, particles and heat can move from regions that were originally disconnected. Pressure and current density profiles are flattened, causing disruptions. The typical timescale for the growth of a tearing mode is on the order of 100 nanoseconds.

== Types ==
- Rayleigh–Taylor instability
- Magnetic reconnection
- Ballooning instability
- Resistive ballooning mode
- Universal instability
- Kelvin–Helmholtz instability
- Disruption instability
- Edge-localized mode
- Transport barrier mode
