= Electron cyclotron resonance =

Phenomenon observed in physics

Electron cyclotron resonance (ECR) is a phenomenon observed in plasma physics, condensed matter physics, and accelerator physics. It happens when the frequency of incident radiation coincides with the natural frequency of rotation of electrons in magnetic fields. A free electron in a static and uniform magnetic field will move in a circle due to the Lorentz force. The circular motion may be superimposed with a uniform axial motion, resulting in a helix, or with a uniform motion perpendicular to the field (e.g., in the presence of an electrical or gravitational field) resulting in a cycloid. The angular frequency (ω = 2πf ) of this cyclotron motion for a given magnetic field strength B is given (in SI units) by

$$\omega_\text{ce} = \frac{eB}{m_\text{e}}$$.

where $e$ is the elementary charge and $m_\text{e}$ is the mass of the electron. For the commonly used microwave frequency 2.45 GHz and the bare electron charge and mass, the resonance condition is met when B = 0.0875 T.

For electrons moving at relativistic speeds v, the formula needs to be adjusted according to the special theory of relativity to:

$$\omega_\text{ce} = \frac{eB}{\gamma m_\text{e}}$$

where

- m_{e} is the electron rest mass
- $\gamma = \frac{1}{\sqrt{1 - \left(\frac{v}{c}\right)^2}}$.

== In plasma physics ==
An ionized plasma may be efficiently produced or heated by superimposing a static magnetic field and a high-frequency electromagnetic field at the electron cyclotron resonance frequency. In the toroidal magnetic fields used in magnetic fusion energy research, the magnetic field decreases with the major radius, so the location of the power deposition can be controlled within about a centimetre. Furthermore, the heating power can be rapidly modulated and is deposited directly into the electrons. These properties make electron cyclotron heating a very valuable research tool for energy transport studies. In addition to heating, electron cyclotron waves can be used to drive current. The inverse process of electron cyclotron emission can be used as a diagnostic of the radial electron temperature profile.

Example of cyclotron resonance between a charged particle and linearly polarized electric field (shown in green). The position vs. time (top panel) is shown as a red trace and the velocity vs. time (bottom panel) is shown as a blue trace. The background magnetic field is directed out towards the observer. Note that the circularly polarized example below assumes there is no Lorentz force due to the wave magnetic field acting on the charged particle. This is equivalent to saying that the charged particle's velocity orthogonal to the wave magnetic field is zero.

Example of cyclotron resonance between a charged particle and circularly polarized electric field (shown in green). The position vs. time (top panel) is shown as a red trace and the velocity vs. time (bottom panel) is shown as a blue trace. The background magnetic field is directed out towards the observer. Note that the circularly polarized example below assumes there is no Lorentz force due to the wave magnetic field acting on the charged particle. This is equivalent to saying that the charged particle's velocity orthogonal to the wave magnetic field is zero.

== ECR ion sources ==
The use of electron cyclotron resonance for efficient plasma generation, especially to obtain large numbers of multiply charged ions, has been applied in diverse fields:

- advanced cancer treatment, where ECR ion sources are crucial for proton therapy,
- advanced semiconductor manufacturing, especially for high density DRAM memories, through plasma etching or other plasma processing technologies,
- electric propulsion devices for spacecraft propulsion, where a broad range of devices (HiPEP, some ion thrusters, or electrodeless plasma thrusters),
- for particle accelerators, on-line mass separation and radioactive ion charge breeding,
- and, as a more mundane example, painting of plastic bumpers for cars.

The ECR ion source makes use of the electron cyclotron resonance to ionize a plasma. Microwaves are injected into a volume at the frequency corresponding to the electron cyclotron resonance, defined by the magnetic field applied to a region inside the volume. The volume contains a low pressure gas. The alternating electric field of the microwaves is set to be synchronous with the gyration period of the free electrons of the gas, and increases their perpendicular kinetic energy. Subsequently, when the energized free electrons collide with the gas in the volume they can cause ionization if their kinetic energy is larger than the ionization energy of the atoms or molecules. The ions produced correspond to the gas type used, which may be pure, a compound, or vapour of a solid or liquid material.

ECR ion sources are able to produce singly charged ions with high intensities (e.g. H^{+} and D^{+} ions of more than 100 mA (electrical) in DC mode using a 2.45 GHz ECR ion source).

For multiply charged ions, the ECR ion source has the advantages that it is able to confine the ions for long enough for multiple collisions and multiple ionization to take place, and the low gas pressure in the source avoids recombination. The VENUS ECR ion source at Lawrence Berkeley National Laboratory has produced in intensity of 0.25 mA (electrical) of Bi^{29+}.

Some important industrial fields would not exist without the use of this fundamental technology, which makes electron cyclotron resonance ion and plasma sources one of the enabling technologies of today's world.

== In condensed matter physics ==
Within a solid the mass in the cyclotron frequency equation above is replaced with the effective mass tensor $m^*$. Cyclotron resonance is therefore a useful technique to measure effective mass and Fermi surface cross-section in solids. In a sufficiently high magnetic field at low temperature in a relatively pure material

$$\begin{align}
\omega_\text{ce} &> \frac{1}{\tau} \\
\hbar{\omega}_\text{ce} &> k_\text{B} T \\
\end{align}$$

where $\tau$ is the carrier scattering lifetime, $k_\text{B}$ is the Boltzmann constant and $T$ is temperature. When these conditions are satisfied, an electron will complete its cyclotron orbit without engaging in a collision, at which point it is said to be in a well-defined Landau level.

== See also ==
- Cyclotron
- ARC-ECRIS
- Ion cyclotron resonance
- Synchrotron
- Gyrotron
- De Haas–van Alphen effect
