= Murder of Liu Mengying =

1932 murder in Hangzhou, China

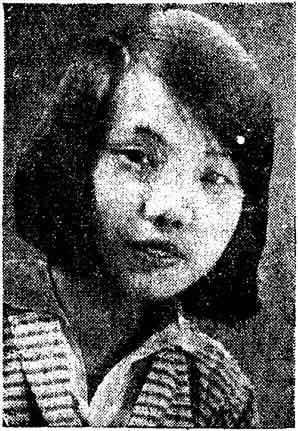
Tao Sijin, c. 1932

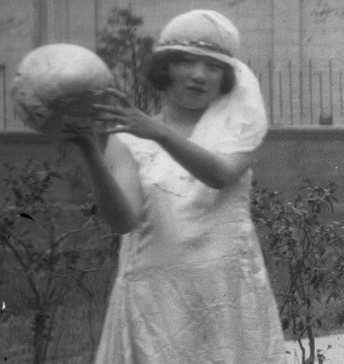
Liu Mengying performing, 1930

In Hangzhou, China, on February 11, 1932, the 21-year-old art student Tao Sijin killed her romantic partner and fellow student, the 20-year-old Liu Mengying, stabbing her over ten times with a kitchen knife. The murder and the ensuing court trial received large amounts of media attention and stirred controversy across China, negatively influencing public attitudes towards homosexual relationships.

The two women met in 1928 and became roommates at the Hangzhou National College of Art the following year, soon entering into a romantic and sexual partnership. According to Tao's diaries, the relationship was frequently marked by jealousy by Liu towards other girls, which intensified after Tao became close to a female instructor. After 1929, the two often lived at a residence and gallery owned by their mentor Xu Qinwen, the former partner of Tao's deceased brother, the designer Tao Yuanqing. Liu and Tao entered into a confrontation over suspected infidelity, which escalated to the murder. Tao maintained that she had acted in self-defense after Liu had threatened her with the knife.

Tao was brought to trial on both state charges and a private suit filed by Liu's older sister. Press coverage and the Hangzhou court initially viewed the situation as a love triangle dispute over Xu. Tao's defense team used her diary as evidence throughout the case, arguing that she could not be found liable due to alleged mental health issues. The defense spread through the media the portrayal of homosexuality as a mental infliction which had driven her to violence. The case received abundant media coverage, partially owing to the high status of Xu and Tao Yuanqing. Newspapers shared excerpts from both girls' diaries, as well as Tao's poems and interview responses. The press was initially highly opposed to Tao, but limited sympathetic coverage led some of the public to view her as a tragic figure. Xu was sentenced to a year in prison, while Tao was initially given a life sentence. After a failed appeal by her defense, this was increased to the death penalty, but the life sentence was restored after further appeal to the Supreme Court in Nanjing. Tao became a Buddhist nun and remained in prison until 1937, when she was released under amnesty during the Japanese occupation. She allegedly married a male official and lived the rest of her life in obscurity.

== Background ==
Tao Sijin (陶思瑾) was born in 1910 in Shaoxing, Zhejiang, into a family of writers and artists. Her older brother Tao Yuanqing (陶元慶) was an influential painter and graphic designer. Liu Mengying (劉夢瑩), born in Hunan in 1912, came from an influential family. Her father, a physician, served as the head of a Kuomintang military hospital in Changsha, and was killed during an attack by the Chinese Communist Party's Red Army in 1930.

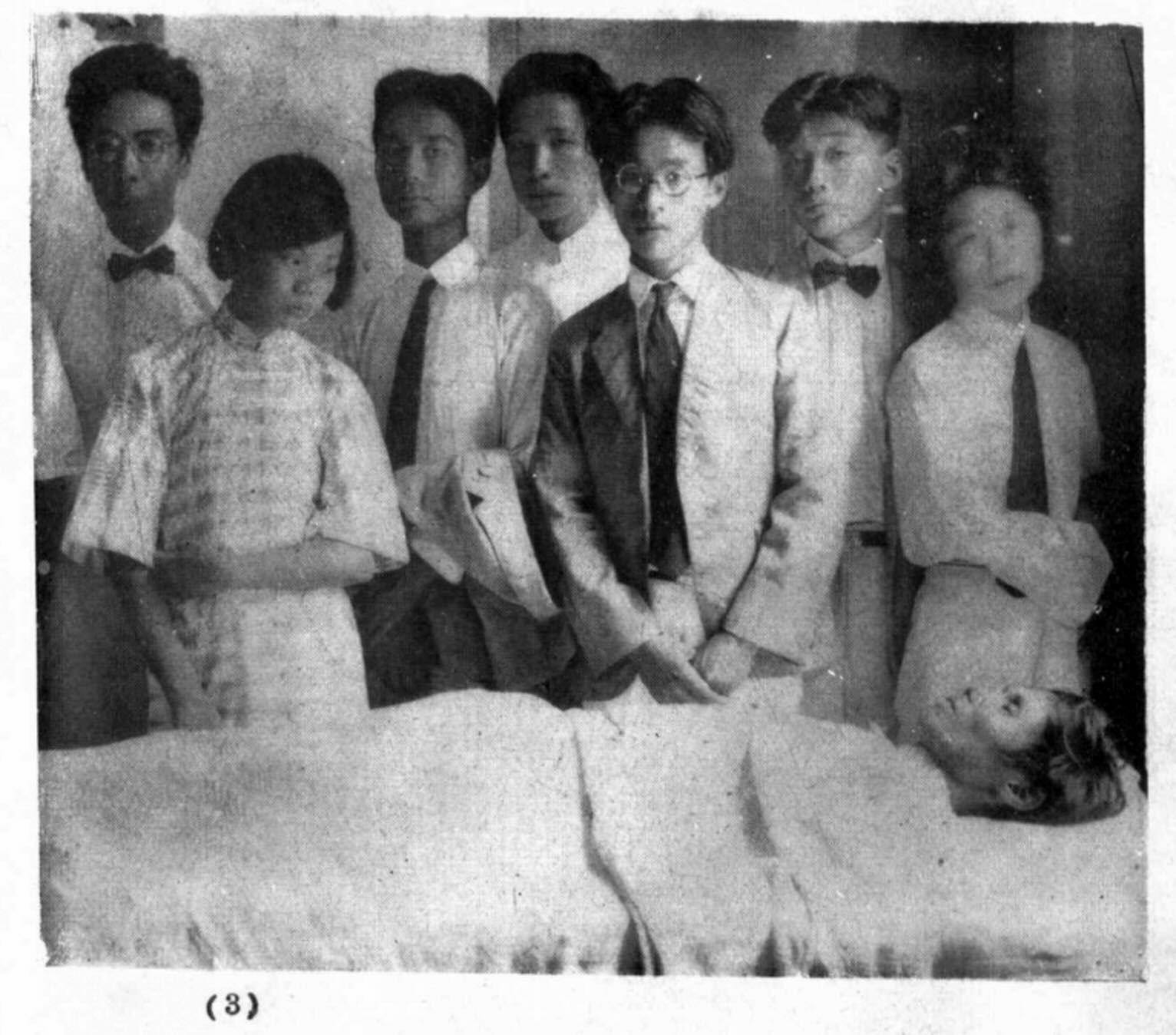
The deathbed of Tao Yuanqing, August 1929. Tao Sijin stands at the front to the viewer's left, with Xu Qinwen behind her at far left.

The two girls met in 1928 while students at the Lida Academy, a Shanghai alternative school where Tao Yuanqing worked as a teacher. After Yuanqing moved to Hangzhou to work at the Hangzhou National College of Art, Tao Sijin and Liu enrolled at the college and became dorm roommates in the spring of 1929. Tao specialized in western-style painting and art critique, while Liu worked in a number of fields, including printmaking, sculpture, ink wash painting, and oil painting. Both girls were close to Yuanqing and his long-term roommate, with whom he shared an affectionate bond, a writer and schoolteacher named Xu Qinwen (許欽文). Yuanqing died of typhoid in August 1929, and Xu volunteered to anonymously pay for Tao Sijin's tuition. Xu purchased a house by the West Lake to serve as an exhibition hall for Tao Yuanqing's paintings, which often served as a residence for Liu and Tao.

The two girls became very close and affectionate with one another; a later court judgment noted that they began taking naps together under a quilt, leading to a "sort of long-term association". They engaged in sexual activity and swore that they would refuse any marriage proposals they received so as to remain together for life. Classmates and teachers at the college knew that they were in a same-sex relationship, as did their mentor Xu, who described their love as more intense than a typical husband and wife. Despite knowing of their relationship, Xu proposed to Tao at some point after her brother's death. Rejected, he proposed instead to Liu, who also rejected him. Tao grew to deeply dislike Xu, calling him the "devil who entangles me" in her diary. However, due to his financial support, she found herself unable to cut ties with him.

Tao wrote in her diaries that she felt intense love for Liu, writing that she was "mad with passion" over her and describing their same-sex love as "sacred". She reported that Liu was paranoid about infidelity and deeply jealous of friends that she would spend time with, and that this led classmates to avoid becoming friendly with her.

== Murder ==
While attending Hangzhou National College, Tao had become close with a female painting teacher named Liu Wenru (劉文如). The two planned to travel to Sichuan together. Liu Mengying complained that Tao had begun to act cold towards her and accused her of having romantic feelings for Liu Wenru. In 1931, Liu Mengying allegedly destroyed a gramophone and vase in Tao's room and stated that she wished to kill Liu Wenru. Following the January 28 incident, a 1932 battle in Shanghai between Chinese and Japanese forces, the Hangzhou National College and its dormitories were closed. Tao and Liu Mengying stayed together at Xu's residence in Hangzhou.

On February 11, 1932, Tao returned to Xu's residence. Xu was not home, and Tao sent her maid Chen Zhugu out to buy cold cream, leaving Tao and Liu alone. Liu urged Tao to stay in Hangzhou for another day or two, as Tao had expressed plans to travel to Shaoxing soon to visit her sick mother. As Tao was in the kitchen making tea, Liu accused her again of being romantically involved with Liu Wenru while Tao maintained that their relationship was platonic. During the confrontation, Tao stabbed Liu to death with a kitchen knife. When the maid returned, she found Liu dead on the ground, naked and with at least ten stab wounds. Tao, found wounded and semiconscious beside her, was arrested at the scene. Liu was twenty at the time of the attack, while Tao was twenty-one.

Tao accused Liu of instigating the violence. In a diary entry from prison dated to the day of the incident, she wrote that she had called Liu a demon and enraged her, leading to Liu attempting to attack her with a knife. She grabbed the knife and killed Liu, kneeling and kissing her corpse. A 1934 description in the newspaper Shen Bao argued that Tao struck first during her argument with Liu, leading Liu to grab a wooden rod to defend herself. After a melee which injured both, Liu attempted to flee, but was struck down by Tao.

== Trial ==
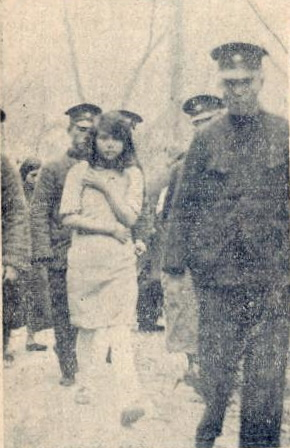
Tao Sijin under escort in 1932

While police investigations over the murder proceeded, Liu's older sister Liu Qingxing (劉慶荇) filed suit against Tao for the murder, naming Xu as an accessory to murder. The state also brought charges, with a trial begun at the Hangzhou County District Court on March 25. The first public hearing on April 1 had an estimated two thousand attendees, who occupied much of the courtroom and broke the window of the front entrance, forcing the judge to delay the hearing.

Liu Qingxing accused Xu of having maintained a love triangle between Liu and Tao, which eventually resulted in the killing. This was the main theory favored by the court, as well as by media coverage of the case. Xu was repeatedly indicted in both civil and criminal courts, accused of ten crimes, including "intended adultery", "enticing underage women", "being over thirty years of age but unmarried", and "housing young women in his bachelor's abode". Liu was accused of having been associated with the Chinese Communist Party, leading Xu to be additionally charged with harboring a suspected communist.

Tao's attorneys, Li Baosen (李寶森) and Wang Shaogong (汪紹功), argued that she suffered from "advanced neurasthenia", a now-outdated psychiatric term describing a weakening of the nerves caused by the stresses of modern life, resulting in fatigue, physical weakness, anxiety, sexual dysfunction, and a depressed mood. Her gender, intellectual pursuits, and lack of physically vigorous activity were seen as increasing her risk of the condition, attested by frequent colds mentioned in her past letters. They also maintained that she had psychasthenia, a now-obsolete term for a condition which results in obsessions and irrational compulsions. As such, they claimed that she could not be found liable for the crime due to her mental state, and advocated for her immediate medical treatment for her psychasthenia and to properly diagnose any physical and mental conditions.

China's criminal code outlined several forms of mental ailment that could result in reduced punishment: perpetrators could be found "insane" (resulting in no criminal liability), "feeble-minded" (精神衰弱; jīngshén shuāiruò, resulting in a reduced sentence), or having an affected state of mind (resulting in an optional sentence reduction at the judge's discretion). The prosecution filed a motion to dismiss the evaluation; they argued that Tao's ability to be admitted to Hangzhou National College of Art pointed to some soundness of mental health. They noted that her family had not previously mentioned poor mental health when she lived by herself, and accused the defense of raising the insanity defense solely as a means to reduce her sentence. Liu Qingxing argued neither neurasthenia nor psychasthenia could compel someone to murder, saying that a lesser sentence for the conditions would mean that "everyone is free to murder others and receive a lesser sentence". She also suggested that Tao's neurasthenia could have developed following the murder. The court dismissed the psychological defense presented by Li and Wang, and Tao was never given a mental examination.

The defense used Tao's diary as its main piece of evidence throughout the case. They presented selections from the diary in court in an attempt to demonstrate that Liu had an "insidious" nature and used excessive coercion against Tao. They argued that since Tao truly loved Liu, any act of violence against her would be impossible without an impaired mental state. Liu's diary was also used as evidence, although it was cited less often both in the trial and in press coverage of the case. Both diaries were confiscated by the court as evidence, although sections were made public through court verdicts.

The Hangzhou District Court found Tao guilty in May 1932 and sentenced her to life imprisonment. Insufficient evidence was found to convict Xu on the state charges, although he was found guilty of seduction by the same court in the suit filed by Liu Qingxing and was sentenced to a year in prison. Li and Wang appealed to the Zhejiang provincial high court in July, arguing that the court verdict misrepresented Tao's behavior as "ruthless". The Zhejiang provincial court upheld the original conviction and imposed steeper punishments, sentencing Tao to death and Xu to two years in prison. The case was appealed to the Supreme Court of the Republic of China in Nanjing, which restored the original sentence imposed by the Hangzhou court.

=== Press coverage ===
Xu and Tao Yuanqing were well known artists, and their connection to the murder case contributed to its widespread attention in news media. Coverage of the murder initially focused on Xu's involvement, with some narratives portraying him as the main instigator, having conspired with Tao to dispose of her main rival for his love. This allowed for some press coverage to depict the murder as part of a conventional heterosexual love affair. Soon after the news broke, the Shanghai literary magazine Wenyi xinwen released an article on the case titled "The New History of Scholars: Xu Qinwen's Extraordinary Love Case". Several articles and editorials accused Xu of sexual impropriety, although coverage in art and literary magazines was typically defensive. As the case progressed, the main charge against Xu shifted towards his alleged harboring of communists, with Tao and Liu's same-sex love becoming the main object of media attention.

Tao and her defense were able to influence public perception through selectively releasing certain portions of the diaries, attempting to portray homosexuality as an affliction that had driven her to violence. Some media coverage compared Tao to the titular character of Oscar Wilde's play Salome, with one contemporary illustration showing her dressed as Salome and carrying Liu's head on a bloodied platter. Public attendance was banned at some court hearings, as the trial was declared to involve "indecency issues". During the trial, Xu published a short story based on the case, The Mutation of Love (爱的突变) in the Shanghai newspaper Shibao. The story was framed as a fictional depiction of a lesbian relationship between students, but was in reality a description of Tao and Liu's relationship using altered names. In response to the short story, the rival newspaper Shijie chenbao (世界晨報) offered a large payment to Tao to write a novel about the case.

One court verdict noted that obscene portions of the diary were omitted from the record, leading to widespread public and media speculation that the diary contained sexually explicit material about the women's relationship. This attracted a great deal of attention towards the excerpts from the diary that were made public, which were then published in newspapers such as the Shibao and the Shishi xinbao. One Shibao headline declared that "fragments of the diary reveal Tao Sijin's entire soul", while the Shishi xinbao described the diaries as testifying to Tao's intense love for Liu. Diary fragments from both women circulated widely among the general public. In one diary entry reprinted in May 1932, Tao claims that Liu had been influenced by works such as Salome to fantasize about "living and dying for love".

In July, Tao published her prison diary in the newspaper Dawan bao, which was serialized over six days under the name "Tao Sijin's Prison Diary: The Blood of Love" (陶思瑾獄中日記：愛的血). The Dawan bao also ran a column titled "Tao's Case Forum" (陶案討論會), which published submitted opinions by readers about the case. A Shibao reporter interviewed Tao in prison twice; she reiterated her claims of self defense and shared samples of her poetry. The reporter wrote that she appeared "as haggard and pitiable as ever; despite the stifling heat of the weather, her demeanor and voice exuded an extraordinary, chilling coldness".

=== Contemporary analysis ===
Initially, Liu received widespread sympathy, while Tao was detested as a murderer. However, sympathetic coverage of Tao in some outlets, including her poetry, led portions of the public to view her as a tragic figure. Tao received letters of support and consolation from across China, and many girls' school students traveled to the prison in which she was held in attempts to see her. A poem by a writer named Wang Aoxi was published in the magazine Shehui yuebao (社会月报) in 1934, proclaiming "I cry for Tao Sijin, and even more for Liu Mengying". One columnist for the Shishi xinbao attributed the murder to a passionate love between Tao and Liu, and advocated for lenient sentencing in order to elevate the importance of love within Chinese society.

Other commentators were far more hostile: a 1933 article in the newspaper Yishi bao called for Tao's execution "as a warning to other homosexuals", arguing that lesbian relationships challenged what was believed to be the natural position of women in relationships with men. One columnist, writing for the Shanghai newspaper Wenhua ribao (文化日報) in 1932, criticized the news media for collaborating with Tao to proliferate her claims in an attempt to reduce her sentence. Tao's arguments in her defense framed homosexual love as a corrupting force on young women.

One reader, writing to the popular woman's magazine Linglong in 1934, argued against a homosexual depiction of Liu and Tao's relationship, writing that "if same-sex love were the cause, [Tao] would not have needed to act in this way". In other coverage, the magazine supported a lesbian interpretation, explaining the murder by citing the British eugenicist Havelock Ellis's writings. Linglong, used Ellis's theories to criticize both Tao's case and lesbian relationships in general, printing that "because [women in lesbian relationships] assume the male role, [disappointment] often leads to violent behavior, therefore disappointment in love often leads to fierce and brutal actions".

The sociologist and eugenicist Pan Guangdan analyzed the case in two essays in the journal Huanian (華年), describing Tao as a "mental invert" suffering paranoid delusions caused by jealousy and inflamed passions. Pan used the case to advocate for professional psychiatrists to make evaluations of defendants in court and for better methods to prevent recidivism in such cases, writing that as it stood, "who can guarantee that she will not be embroiled in homosexual love once more and will not be driven by jealousy to kill once more?" Tao's defense submitted Pan's essays to the court as evidence. The Suzhou physician and sexologist Gu Yin, a health writer, described Tao's actions as an endocrinological issue, pointing to increased psychological stress that women experience during their menstrual cycle. He theorized that women who experience "unusual sexual excitation during menstrual periods, including homosexual arousal" were more likely to "commit a murderous crime when rejected by a girlfriend".

== Aftermath ==
Within two months of the murder, a stage play entitled Tao Sijin and Liu Mengying (陶思瑾与刘梦莹) based on the case was produced by a Shanghai theater to widespread attendance. Liu Qingxing filed a lawsuit against the theater to halt the production, and the Hangzhou National College of Art petitioned against it on the grounds that it was "detrimental to public morals". The theater responded with an announcement noting that "in the interest of securing an impartial judicial ruling, we have therefore decided to extend the run of the performance".

In late 1933, Tao adopted Buddhist religious practices, abstaining from the consumption of meat and chanting sutras every morning and evening as penance. Studying under a Buddhist master, she made calligraphic copies of sutras and burned these as offerings. In early 1936, she took initiation vows to become a nun, which was favorably reported by Buddhist religious press. The outbreak of the Second Sino-Japanese War in 1937 led to the Japanese occupation of much of China. Hangzhou fell to Japanese forces on December 24, and Tao was freed as part of a general amnesty and began working as a teacher. In June 1939, she was reported to have married a male county official from Zhejiang. This was seen by the press as a 'return to normalcy' and as evidence that homosexuality could be cured. No further information about her life was reported.

Xu wrote about the case in a set of his memoirs, published in 1937, giving anecdotes about the lengthy trial and offering his own psychological theories of what led to the murder. These memoirs largely reflect popular psychological thinking at the time, describing homosexuality as a mental condition caused by unfulfilled heterosexual desire.

=== Legacy ===
Coverage of the case in the press continued intermittently for two years following the incident. Media coverage of the incident shaped public attitudes towards same-sex relationships in China, during a general trend of worsening public attitudes towards homosexuality from the 1920s to the 1940s. Media coverage both boosted existing prejudices against homosexuality, and helped to establish a narrative of same-sex relationships as deviant and unstable. This led to many among the public seeing homosexuality as a dangerous condition which could lead to violence. A 1946 Chinese handbook on marriage etiquette cited Tao as an example of how homosexuality led to murder.

== See also ==
- LGBTQ history in China
  - Homosexuality in China
- Violence against LGBTQ people
