= Song Jiashu (physicist) =

Chinese physicist

- 宋家树
- Born: 21 March 1932; Changsha, Hunan, China
- Died: 30 June 2024 (aged 92); Beijing, China
- Education: Jilin University
- Scientific career
- Fields: Materials science
- Workplaces: China Academy of Engineering Physics

Chinese name
- Simplified Chinese: 宋家树
- Traditional Chinese: 宋家樹
Transcriptions
Standard Mandarin
- Hanyu Pinyin: Sòng Jiāshù

Song Jiashu (Chinese: 宋家树; 21 March 1932 – 30 June 2024) was a Chinese materials scientist, and an academician of the Chinese Academy of Sciences.

== Biography ==
Song was born into a family of political figures, in Changsha, Hunan, on 21 March 1932, to Song Manjun (宋曼君), a politician, and (陶华), a graduate of Anqing Normal University. His ancestral home was in Shucheng, Anhui. His grandfather Song Zhusun (宋竹荪) graduated from the Japanese Military and Political School and was a member of the Tongmenghui. Due to the Second Sino-Japanese War, he constantly migrated with his parents in provinces and cities such as Hunan, Hubei, Chongqing, Henan, Shanghai, and Jiangsu. In 1950, he enrolled to Dalian University of Technology (renamed Dalian University of Technology in 1988). In 1952, the Chinese Communist Party regrouped the country's higher education institutions in an attempt to build a Soviet style system where each institution specialized in a certain field of study, such as social sciences or natural sciences. The Physics Department of Dalian University of Technology was merged into Northeast Renmin University (renamed Jilin University in 1958). He joined the Chinese Communist Party (CCP) in October 1953. After graduation, he stayed for teaching.

In the early 1960s, Song was transferred to the Beijing No. 9 Research Institute to participate in China's nuclear weapon research and development, and began to enter the field of nuclear material application research. In early 1964, Song was transferred again to the state-owned No. 221 Factory in Qinghai base as deputy director of the production department workshop, responsible for the development of nuclear material components, which are the core of atomic and hydrogen bombs. During the Cultural Revolution, he suffered political persecution and forced to suspend his work for three years. In September 1973, he was transferred to the newly founded No. 903 Factory, responsible for the establishment of the factory, as well as technical, research, and production tasks. In December 1985, he became chief engineer of the Military Industry Bureau of the Ministry of Nuclear Industry, participating in the technical leadership and management of the ministry's military industry. In 1986, he was appointed a researcher and senior advisor at the International Institute of Technology and Economics of the Development Research Center of the State Council. From 1991 to 1996, he served as a member of the Science and Technology Committee of the China Academy of Engineering Physics, a part-time member of the Science and Technology Committee of the National Defense Science and Technology Commission, vice president of the China Nuclear Materials Society, and a member of the Expert Committee of the Nuclear Materials Control Office of the China Atomic Energy Agency.

On 30 June 2024, Song died in Beijing, at the age of 92.

== Honours and awards ==
- 1993 Member of the Chinese Academy of Sciences (CAS)
