= Yutaka Tsujinaka =

Japanese political scientist

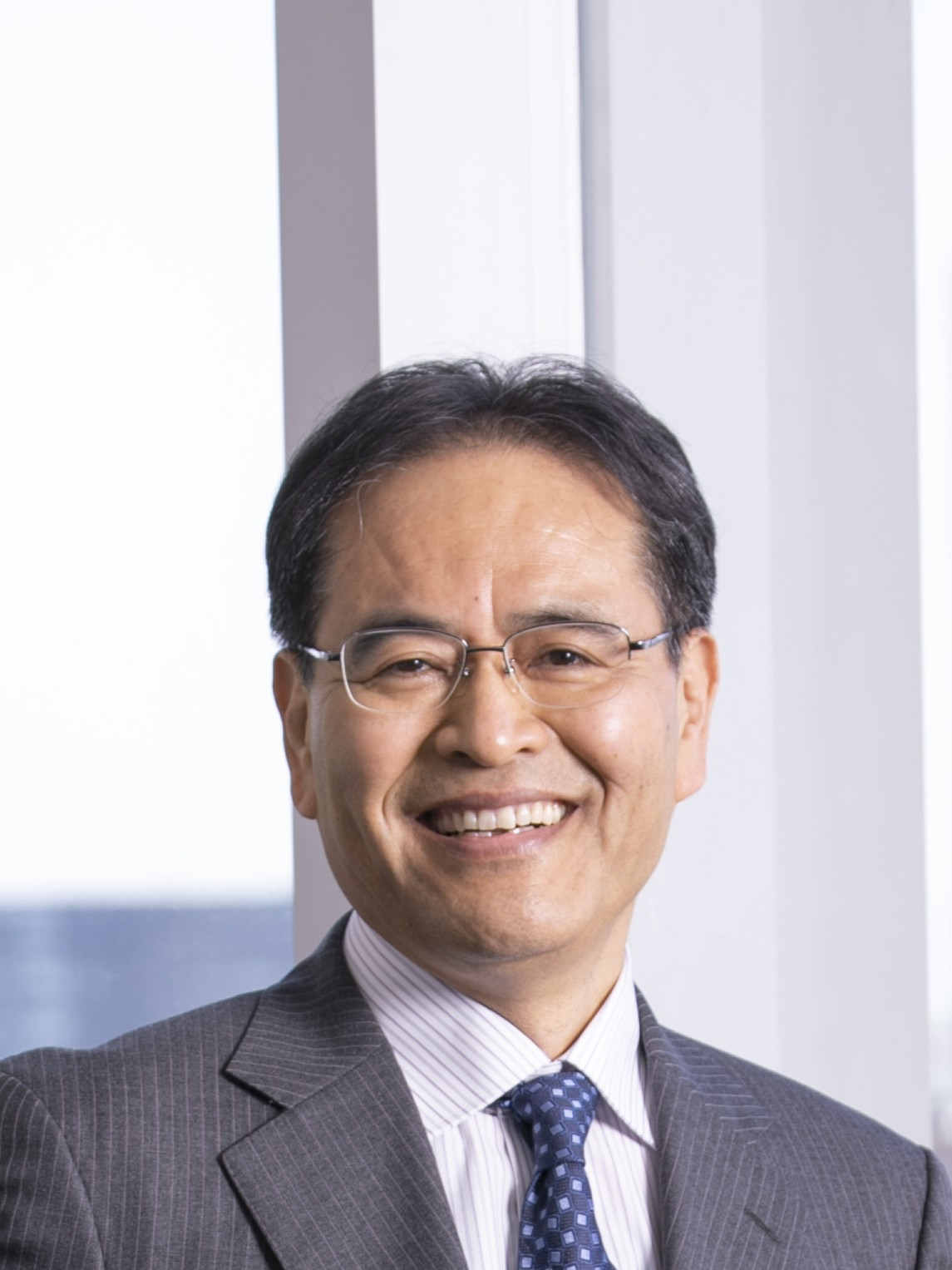
- At the President’s Office, Toyo Gakuen University
- Born: 1954 (age 71–72); Osaka, Japan
- Occupation: President of Toyo Gakuen University

Academic work
- Discipline: Political Science; Interest group Civil society
- Institutions: Toyo Gakuen University; University of Tsukuba; Tokai University
- Notable works: Interest Group Politics in Japan; Neighborhood Associations and Local Governance in Japan; Aftermath: Fukushima and the 3.11 Earthquake 『21世紀世界の市民社会・利益団体』 『政治変動期の圧力団体』
- Website: tsujinaka.net

Yutaka Tsujinaka (born 1954) is a Japanese political scientist and professor emeritus at the University of Tsukuba. He has previously served as professor and vice president at the University of Tsukuba, vice president at Tokai University, president at Toyo Gakuen University, and visiting professor at the University of Tsukuba. His areas of expertise include interest groups (interest organizations and pressure groups), public policy, civil society, and social capital research. He is a leading researcher of interest groups and civil society in Japan.

He studied under Wataru Sakano, Michio Muramatsu, Katsumi Yamakawa, and Tadao Adachi. He served as a board member of the International Association of Universities (IAU) (2012-2016), president of the Japanese Political Science Association (JPSA) (2014-2016), director of the Institute for Comparative Research in Human and Social Sciences (ICR) at the University of Tsukuba (2014-2018), professor of the department of political science and economics at Tokai University (2018-2022), and vice president of Tokai University (in charge of departments of humanities) (2019-2022). Currently he is the president of Toyo Gakuen University (2022–present).

== Academic background ==
- 1972 Graduate from Kozu High School in Osaka
- 1976 LL.B Osaka University, School of Law
- 1978 LL.M. Osaka University, School of Law (Political Science)
- 1981 Completion of the coursework for doctoral program of Osaka University School of Law (Political Science)
- 1996 Doctor of Law (Political Science) Kyoto University

== Positions and Teaching Career ==
- Apr. 1981 Full-time Lecturer, Faculty of Law (Department of Political Science), The University of Kitakyushu
- Apr. 1984 Associate Professor, Faculty of Law, The University of Kitakyushu
- Oct. 1986 Associate Professor, College of Social Sciences (Major in Political Science), University of Tsukuba
- Jul. 1989 Visiting Research Fellow, Cornell University East Asian Program and Department of Government, (- May 1991)
- Jun. 1996 Director, Public Policy Studies Association Japan (-Jun. 2000)
- 1996 Received a PhD in Law from Kyoto University
- Feb. 1998 Editorial Board of the political science journal “Leviathan” (-2009)
- Oct. 1998 Professor, College of Social Sciences (Major in Political Science), University of Tsukuba
- Apr. 2001 Dean and Councilor, College of Social Sciences, University of Tsukuba (-2004)
- Jun. 2002 Director, Public Policy Studies Association Japan (-Jun. 2008)
- Apr. 2003 Project Leader, Civil Society the State and Culture in Comparative Perspective Special Research Project, University of Tsukuba (-Mar. 2008)
- Apr. 2004 Professor, Faculty of Humanities and Social Sciences, Advisor to the President, Head of Office for the Promotion of International Affairs, University of Tsukuba (-Mar. 2006)
- Oct. 2004 Director, Public Policy Studies Association Japan
- Apr. 2006 Special Assistant to the President, University of Tsukuba responsible for international cooperation -Mar.2008
- Apr. 2011 Vice President, University of Tsukuba (-Mar. 2013)
- 2011 Science Adviser, Ministry of Education, Culture, Sports, Science and Technology
- 2012 Director, International Association of Universities (IAU) -2016
- 2013 Special Assistant to the President, University of Tsukuba responsible for international cooperation
- Apr. 2013 Chairman, Internationalization Council, International Association of Universities (IAU)
- 2013 Director, Institute for Comparative Research in Human and Social Sciences (ICR), University of Tsukuba
- 2014 President, Japanese Political Science Association -2016
- Apr. 2017 Head, Department of International Japanese Studies, Humanities and Social Sciences, University of Tsukuba
- Apr. 2018 Professor, Department of Political Science and Economics, Tokai University (-2022)
- Apr. 2018 Vice President (in charge of departments of humanities), Dean of Law, Tokai University
- Apr. 2021 Steering Committee Member, Research Center for Science Systems, Japan Society for the Promotion of Science (-current)
- Sep. 2021 Councilor, Director, Toyo Gakuen University
- Apr. 2022 President, Toyo Gakuen University (-current)

== English-language publications ==
=== Books and book chapters ===
- Katzenstein, Peter J.; Tsujinaka, Yutaka (1991). Defending the Japanese State: Structures, Norms and the Political Responses to Terrorism and Violent Social Protest in the 1970s and 1980s. Cornell University Press.
- Tsujinaka, Yutaka (1993). "Rengo and Its Osmotic Networks". In Allison, Gary D.; Sone, Yasunori (eds.). Political Dynamics in Contemporary Japan. Cornell University Press. pp. 200–213.
- Katzenstein, Peter J.; Tsujinaka, Yutaka (1995). ""Bullying", "Buying", and "Binding": US-Japanese Transnational Relations and Domestic Structures". In Risse-Kappen, Thomas (ed.). Bringing the Transnational Relations Back In: Non-State Actors, Domestic Structures and International Institutions. Cambridge University Press. pp. 79–111.
- Knoke, David; Pappi, Frantz Urban; Broadbent, Jefferey; Tsujinaka, Yutaka (1996). Comparing Policy Networks: Labor Politics in the U.S., Germany, and Japan. Cambridge University Press.
- Tsujinaka, Yutaka (2003). "From Developmentalism to Maturity: Japan's Civil Society Organizations in a Comparative Perspective". In Schwartz, Frank J.; Pharr, Susan J. (eds.). The State of Civil Society in Japan. Cambridge University Press. pp. 83–115.
- Tsujinaka, Yutaka (2008). "Japan's Internal Security Policy". In Katzenstein, Peter J. (ed.). Rethinking Japanese Security: Internal and External Dimensions. Routledge. pp. 76–103.
- Pekkanen, Robert; Tsujinaka, Yutaka (2008). "Neighbourhood Associations and the Demographic Challenge". In Coulmas, F.; Conrad, H.; Schad-Seifert, A.; Vogt, G. (eds.). The Demographic Challenge: A Handbook about Japan. Brill. pp. 707–720.
- Tsujinaka, Yutaka (2010). "Civil Society and Social Capital in Japan". In Anheier, Helmut; Toepler, Stefan (eds.). International Encyclopedia of Civil Society. Springer. pp. 252–259. doi:10.1007/978-0-387-93996-4_727. ISBN 978-0-387-93994-0.
- Pekkanen, Robert; Kawamoto, Yuko; Tsujinaka, Yutaka (2012). "Civil Society and the Triple Disasters: Revealed Strengths and Weaknesses". In Kingston, Jeff (ed.). Natural Disaster and Nuclear Crisis in Japan: Response and Recovery after Japan's 3/11. Routledge. pp. 78–93.
- Pekkanen, Robert J.; Tsujinaka, Yutaka; Yamamoto, Hidehiro (2014). Neighborhood Associations and Local Governance in Japan. Routledge.
- Pekkanen, Robert J.; Smith, Steven Rathgeb; Tsujinaka, Yutaka, eds. (2014). Nonprofits and Advocacy: Engaging Community and Government in an Era of Retrenchment. The Johns Hopkins University Press.
- Quadir, Fahimul; Tsujinaka, Yutaka, eds. (2015). Civil Society in Asia: In Search of Democracy and Development in Bangladesh. Routledge.
- Tsujinaka, Yutaka; Ahmed, Shakil; Kobashi, Yohei (2015). "Constructing Co-Governance between Government and Civil Society: An Institutional Approach to Collaboration". In Jamil, Ishtiaq; Aminuzzaman, Salahuddin M.; Haque, Sk. Tawfique M. (eds.). Governance in South, Southeast, and East Asia: Trends, Issues and Challenges. Springer.
- Dadabaev, Timur; Ismailov, Murod; Tsujinaka, Yutaka (2017). Social Capital Construction and Governance in Central Asia: Communities and NGOs in post-Soviet Uzbekistan. Palgrave Macmillan US.
- Tsujinaka, Yutaka; Inatsugu, Hiroaki (2017). Aftermath: Fukushima and the 3.11 Earthquake (Japanese Society). Trans Pacific Press.
- Tsujinaka, Yutaka (2026). "Civil Society and Social Capital in Japan". In List, Regina A.; Anheier, Helmut K.; Toepler, Stefan (eds.). International Encyclopedia of Civil Society. Cham: Springer. pp. 1–14. doi:10.1007/978-3-319-99675-2_727-2. ISBN 978-3-319-99675-2.

=== Journal articles ===
- Tsujinaka, Yutaka; Pekkanen, Robert (2007). "Civil Society and Interest Groups in Contemporary Japan". Pacific Affairs. 80 (3): 419–437. doi:10.5509/2007803419. hdl:2241/00150213.
- Tsujinaka, Yutaka; Choe, Jae-Young; Ohtomo, Takafumi (2007). "Exploring the Realities of Japanese Civil Society through Comparison". ASIEN.
- Kojima, Kazuko; Choe, Jae-Young; Ohtomo, Takafumi; Tsujinaka, Yutaka (2012). "The Corporatist System and Social Organizations in China". Management and Organization Review. 8 (3): 609–628. doi:10.1111/j.1740-8784.2012.00298.x.
- Tsujinaka, Yutaka; Ahmed, Shakil; Kobashi, Yohei (2013). "Constructing Co-governance between Government and Civil Society: An Institutional Approach to Collaboration". Public Organization Review. 13 (4): 411–426. doi:10.1007/s11115-013-0260-9.
- Okura, Sae; Tkach-Kawasaki, Leslie; Kobashi, Yohei; Hartwig, Manuela; Tsujinaka, Yutaka (2016). "Analysis of the Policy Network for the "Feed-in Tariff Law" in Japan: Evidence from the GEPON Survey". Journal of Contemporary Eastern Asia. 15. World Association for Triple Helix and Future Strategy Studies: 41–63. doi:10.17477/jcea.2016.15.1.041.
- Sagara, Tomoya; Kaigo, Muneo; Tsujinaka, Yutaka (2020). "Meta-Cognition of Efficacy and Social Media Usage among Japanese Civil Society Organizations". Information. 11 (2): 118. doi:10.3390/info11020118. hdl:2241/00161426.
- Yanagi, Itaru; Kobashi, Yohei; Pekkanen, Robert J.; Tsujinaka, Yutaka (2021). "Distinguishing Providing Public Services from Receiving Government Funding as Factors in Nonprofit Advocacy". VOLUNTAS: International Journal of Voluntary and Nonprofit Organizations. 32 (3): 534–547. doi:10.1007/s11266-020-00206-9.

=== Other publications ===
- Tsujinaka, Yutaka (2002), The Cultural Dimension in Measuring Social Capital: Perspective from Japan
- Tsujinaka, Yutaka; Pekkanen, Robert; Ohtomo, Takafumi (2005), Civil Society Groups and Policy-Making in Contemporary Japan
- Tsujinaka, Yutaka (2005), Chinese Civil Society Organisations from the Comparative Perspective: Civil Society Organisations Research (JIGS) 6-Country Comparison
- Tsujinaka, Yutaka; Abe, Hiroomi (2016), Social Capital and Citizen Satisfaction in Associational Perspective: Analyzing Urban Governance in Japan

== See also ==
- University of Tsukuba
- Tokai University
- Toyo Gakuen University
