= Yu Chung-han =

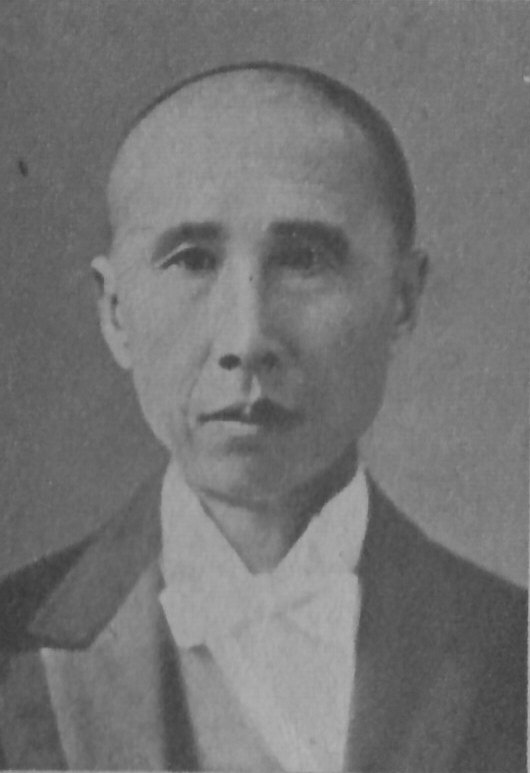
Yu Chung-han

Yu Chung-han (simplified Chinese: 于冲汉; traditional Chinese: 于沖漢; pinyin: Yú Chōnghàn; 1871 – 12 November 1932) was a prominent civilian politician in Zhang Xueliang's Northeastern government, who favored the autonomy of Manchuria and aided Japan's establishment of the puppet state of Manchukuo.

Yu Chung-han, was a prominent elder statesman of Zhang Xueliang's Government in Mukden and the leader of the civilian group in Manchuria, which favored "hokyo anmin" (secure boundary and peaceful life). According to him, this meant that the protection and prosperity of the Northeastern Provinces should be the supreme concern of the government, including its relationship with China proper. He intended to achieve this through tax reforms, improvement of the wage system for government officials, and abolition of the costly army, thereby ensuring that the people in Manchuria would benefit from peaceful labor, while defense would be entrusted to Japan.

Following the Mukden Incident and the Japanese seizure of southern Manchuria, he was installed as chief of the Japanese imposed Self-Government Guiding Board on November 10, 1931. As the Chief of the Board, he, along with Governor Zang Shiyi, of Liaoning province, made plans for a new state to be established in February 1932.

Upon learning of the complete defeat and expulsion of Zhang Xueliang from Jinzhou, the pro-Japanese Self-Government Association, led by General Zhang Jinghui as Governor of the Province on 7 January 1932, declared the independence of Heilongjiang Province under the protection of Japan. On the same day, the Self-Government Guiding Board in Mukden issued a Proclamation, appealing to the people of the Northeast to overthrow Zhang Xueliang and join the Northeastern Self-Government Association, which later became the state of Manchukuo in March 1932.

External links

- IMTFE Judgement, Invasion & Occupation of Manchuria
- On the Backgrounds of the Pacific War
