= Divertor Tokamak Test =

Planned testbed tokamak in Frascati, Italy

DTT
Divertor Tokamak Test
- Device type: Tokamak
- Location: Frascati, Italy
- Affiliation: ENEA

Technical specifications
- Major radius: 2.19 m
- Minor radius: 0.7 m
- Magnetic field: 6 T (60,000 G)
- Heating power: 45 MW
- Discharge duration: 95 s
- Plasma current: 5.5 MA

History
- Date(s) of construction: ongoing

Links
- Website: DTT - Divertor Tokamak Test facility

The Divertor Tokamak Test (DTT) is a planned superconducting tokamak currently under construction in Frascati, Italy. It is set to be operated by the Italian government-sponsored research and development agency, ENEA, and will serve as a testbed for the construction of a DEMOnstration Power Plant. Its primary focus is to investigate the challenges posed by thermal heat loads endured by the divertor of a fusion power plant.

DTT was initially proposed in 2015 as part of the EUROfusion program, and it is scheduled for operation in 2026.
