= Surgery for temporomandibular joint dysfunction =

- Specialty: Oral and maxillofacial surgeon

Attempts in the last decade to develop surgical treatments based on MRI and CAT scans now receive less attention. These techniques are reserved for the most difficult cases where other therapeutic modalities have failed. The American Society of Maxillofacial Surgeons recommends a conservative/non-surgical approach first. Only 20% of patients need to proceed to surgery.

Examples of surgical procedures that are used in TMD, some more commonly than others, include arthrocentesis, arthroscopy, meniscectomy, disc repositioning, condylotomy or joint replacement. Invasive surgical procedures in TMD may cause symptoms to worsen. Meniscectomy, also termed discectomy refers to the surgical removal of the articular disc. This is rarely carried out in TMD, it may have some benefits for pain, but dysfunction may persist and overall there it leads to degeneration or remodeling of the TMJ.

== Arthrocentesis ==
TMJ arthrocentesis refers to lavage (flushing out) of the upper joint space (where most of the translation movement takes place) with saline via the introduction of cannulae. It is theorized that the hydraulic pressure generated within the joint combined with external manipulation is capable of releasing adhesions or the anchored disc phenomenon and leads to an improvement in the movement ("lysis and lavage"). It is also suggested that undesirable contents within the synovial fluid of the joint can be washed out, such as microscopic debris (from breakdown of the articular surfaces) and pain mediators (enzymes and prostaglandins), and there is also stimulation of the synovial membrane to restore its normal lubricating function. It was initially used to treat acute closed lock, however it has since come to be used chronic closed lock, chronic anterior displaced disc with reduction, and degenerative joint disease (e.g. arthritis). In acute closed lock, it is theorized that the upper joint space is inflated from its normally collapsed state during this procedure, and this extra space frees up the articular disc which returns to its correct position. This is the least invasive, and easiest to carry out of the surgical options. It can be carried out under local anesthetic (and for this reason is cheaper than arthroscopy, although it may also carried out under general anesthetic) and has minimal complications. Although it has been suggested that arthrocentesis decreases pain, increases maximal incisal opening and has prolonged effects, when the procedure was investigated by a systematic review, the impact on pain was comparable to arthroscopy and the results are unstable. The review concluded by suggesting that arthrocentesis only be used for TMD within well designed randomized controlled trial (i.e. for the purposes of further research and not for routine management). Arthrocentesis may be combined with injection of sodium hyaluronate into the joint at the end of the lavage with the aim to improve lubrication within the joint.

== Arthroscopy ==
Arthroscopy involves the introduction of an arthroscope (a very thin, flexible camera) into the joint via single cannula (as opposed to arthrocentesis which usually involves 2 cannulae and no arthroscope), allowing the joint space to be visualized on a monitor and explored by the surgeon. Arthroscopy is also used in other joints and the technique is similar to laparoscopy. The cannula is inserted via a small incision just in front of the ear. The arthroscope has a built in capacity to pump in or suck out saline. Arthroscopy may be intended as a purely diagnostic procedure, or it may be employed in combination with surgical interventions within the joint, in which case a second "working" cannula is also inserted into the joint. Examples include release of adhesions (e.g. by blunt dissection or with a laser) or release of the disc. Biopsies or disc reduction can also be carried out during arthroscopy. Arthroscopy is usually carried out under general anesthesia. Arthroscopy has advantages over arthrocentesis in that it allows for detection of problems inside the joint such as perforation or synovitis. As with arthrocentesis, the procedure may be combined with sodium hyaluronate injection into the joint at the end of the procedure.

== Intra-articular injections ==
Both sodium hyaluronate and glucocorticoids have been injected into the joints in order to treat TMD. Sodium hyaluronate is a component of the normal synovial fluid that fills the joint spaces in health. Its function is to lubricate and maintain the internal environment of the joint. It has been used for arthritis in the knee and hip joints, and it was first used for TMD in 1985. A systematic review found that hyaluronate might be beneficial for clinical TMD signs in the long term, but that this may be unstable. The effects of hyaluronate may be similar to glucocorticoids. There may be added benefit in arthrocentesis or arthroscopy if intra-articular injections are combined with these procedures. Reported adverse events are minor and temporary.

== Joint replacement ==
Prosthetic TMJ placement surgery is used as a last resort to manage severe pain and restricted function due to TMJ disorders. At the onset of symptoms, primary prevention such as a soft diet, cessation of gum chewing, physiotherapy and the use of non-steroidal anti-inflammatory drugs are put into place. If primary prevention fails, TMJ joint replacement is one of the several surgical options. Recent studies have shown TMJ replacement surgery to be highly successful, improving mean pain scores, mean diet scores, mean maximum inter-incisal opening, and mean function and speech scores.

Synthetic jaw implants already on the market prior to the 1976 Federal law requiring medical devices be proven safe and effective were exempt and continued to be sold after 1976 without proof of safety. Teflon implants made by Vitek, and silicone ones made by Dow Corning, raised the most concern. Vitek-Kent Proplast-Teflon partial & total prosthesis were manufactured from 1982 to 1990 in Houston TX. TMJ prostheses became popular with the introduction of Vitek, but evidence that the implants could cause debilitating reactions including pain, malocclusion, and foreign-body giant cell reaction (FBGCR) resulting in degeneration of the surrounding tissue led to a recall by the FDA on 7 January 1991. Since Vitek declared bankruptcy in June 1990 and the owner fled the country, the FDA was left to handle the recall, which they did by sending out a safety alert and public health advisory. Otherwise, there was next to no follow-up on the recall. Silastic silicone TMJ Implants produced by Dow Corning became popular during the 1970s, but reports of widespread mechanical failure with wear, tearing, and fracture began to surface. Debris and fragments led to an inflammatory response, joint degeneration, bony ankylosis, and lymph node swelling. Marketing of Silastic for use in the TMJ was discontinued on 15 June 1993 after warnings from the FDA and the American Association of Oral and Maxillofacial Surgeons (AAOMS).

To date, the FDA has approved only 4 TMJ Implants by 3 manufacturers: the Anspach patient fitted Total TMJ Joint Replacement System by TMJ Concepts; the Walter Lorenz Total TMJ Replacement System by Biomet Microfixation; the TMJ Metal-on-Metal Total Joint Replacement System, and the Christensen TMJ Fossa-Eminence System (patient specific partial), both by TMJ Medical.

The Hoffman-Pappas Total TMJ Replacement System produced by Endotech has been in use since 1995 while awaiting final FDA approval. Working with Dr. Mike Pappas, Dr. David Hoffman of Staten Island University Hospital received approval by the FDA to undertake a national study to investigate a clinical trial on the prosthetic joint system.
