= Tokamak Fusion Test Reactor =

Former experimental tokamak at Princeton Plasma Physics Laboratory

TFTR
Tokamak Fusion Test Reactor
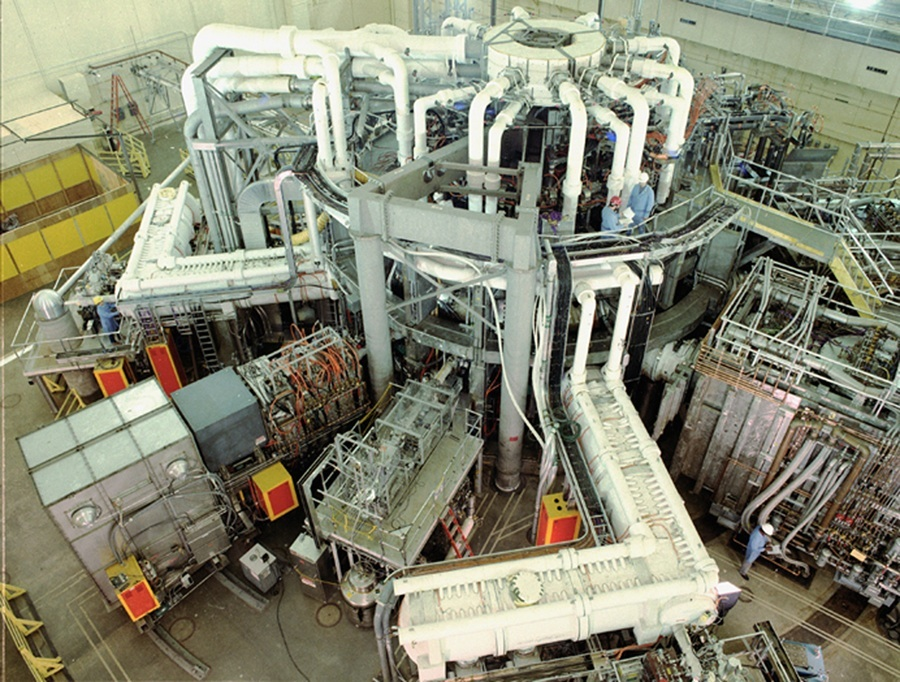
- TFTR in 1989
- Device type: Tokamak
- Location: Princeton, New Jersey, US
- Affiliation: Princeton Plasma Physics Laboratory

Technical specifications
- Major radius: 2.52 m (8 ft 3 in)
- Minor radius: 0.87 m (2 ft 10 in)
- Magnetic field: 5.2 T (52,000 G) (toroidal)
- Heating power: 51 MW
- Plasma current: 3 MA

History
- Year(s) of operation: 1982–1997
- Preceded by: Princeton Large Torus (PLT)
- Succeeded by: National Spherical Torus Experiment (NSTX)
- Related devices: JT-60

The Tokamak Fusion Test Reactor (TFTR) was an experimental tokamak built at Princeton Plasma Physics Laboratory (PPPL) circa 1980 and entering service in 1982. TFTR was designed with the explicit goal of reaching scientific breakeven, the point where the heat being released from the fusion reactions in the plasma is equal or greater than the heating being supplied to the plasma by external devices to warm it up.

The TFTR never achieved this goal, but it did produce major advances in confinement time and energy density. It was the world's first magnetic fusion device to perform extensive scientific experiments with plasmas composed of 50/50 deuterium/tritium (D-T), the fuel mix required for practical fusion power production, and also the first to produce more than 10 MW of fusion power. It set several records for power output, maximum temperature, and fusion triple product.

TFTR shut down in 1997 after fifteen years of operation. PPPL used the knowledge from TFTR to begin studying another approach, the spherical tokamak, in their National Spherical Torus Experiment. The Japanese JT-60 is very similar to the TFTR, both tracing their design to key innovations introduced by Shoichi Yoshikawa during his time at PPPL and the University of Tokyo in the 1970s.

== General ==
In nuclear fusion, there are two broad approaches capable of producing net energy from fusion: magnetic confinement reactors and inertial confinement reactors. The former method of fusion seeks to lengthen the time that ions spend close together in order to fuse them together, while the latter aims to fuse the ions so fast that they do not have time to move apart.

Inertial confinement reactors, unlike magnetic confinement reactors, use laser fusion and ion-beam fusion in order to cause fusion. With magnetic confinement reactors there is no need to find a material that can withstand the high temperatures of nuclear fusion reactions. In tokamak reactors the heating current is induced by the changing magnetic fields in central induction coils and probably must exceed a million amperes. Magnetic fusion devices keep the hot plasma out of contact with the walls of its container by keeping it moving in circular or helical paths by means of the magnetic force on charged particles and by a centripetal force acting on the moving particles.

== History ==
=== PPPL switch to tokamak ===
In 1968, the 3rd IAEA Fusion Energy Conference was held in Novosibirsk, where the Soviet delegation claimed their T-3 tokamak had reached performance levels at least an order of magnitude better than any other device. The claims were initially met with skepticism, but when the results were confirmed by a UK team the next year, this huge advance led to a "virtual stampede" of tokamak construction.

In the US, one of the major approaches being studied up to this point was the stellarator, whose development was limited almost entirely to the PPPL. Their latest design, the Model C, had been operating since 1962 and demonstrated performance well below their expectations, far from that required for a reactor. With the confirmation of the T-3 tokamak results, they immediately began converting the Model C to a tokamak layout, known as the Symmetrical Tokamak (ST). This was completed in the short time of only eight months, entering service in May 1970. ST's computerized diagnostics allowed it to quickly match the Soviet results, and from that point, the entire fusion world was increasingly focused on the tokamak over other types.

=== Princeton Large Torus ===
During the early 1970s, Shoichi Yoshikawa was looking over the tokamak concept. He noted that as the size of the reactor's minor axis (the diameter of the tube) increased compared to its major axis (the diameter of the entire system) the system became more efficient. An added benefit was that as the minor axis increased, confinement time improved for the simple reason that it took longer for the fuel ions to reach the outside of the reactor. This led to widespread acceptance that designs with lower aspect ratios were a key advance over earlier models.

This led to the Princeton Large Torus (PLT), which was completed in 1975. This system was successful to the point where it quickly reached the limits of its Ohmic heating system, the system that passed current through the plasma to heat it. Among the many ideas proposed for further heating, in cooperation with Oak Ridge National Laboratory, PPPL developed the idea of neutral beam injection. This used small particle accelerators to inject fuel atoms directly into the plasma, both heating it and providing fresh fuel.

After a number of modifications to the beam injection system, the newly equipped PLT began setting records and eventually made several test runs at 60 million K, more than enough for a fusion reactor. To reach the Lawson criterion for ignition, all that was needed was higher plasma density, and there seemed to be no reason this would not be possible in a larger machine. There was widespread belief that break-even would be reached during the 1970s.

=== TFTR concept ===
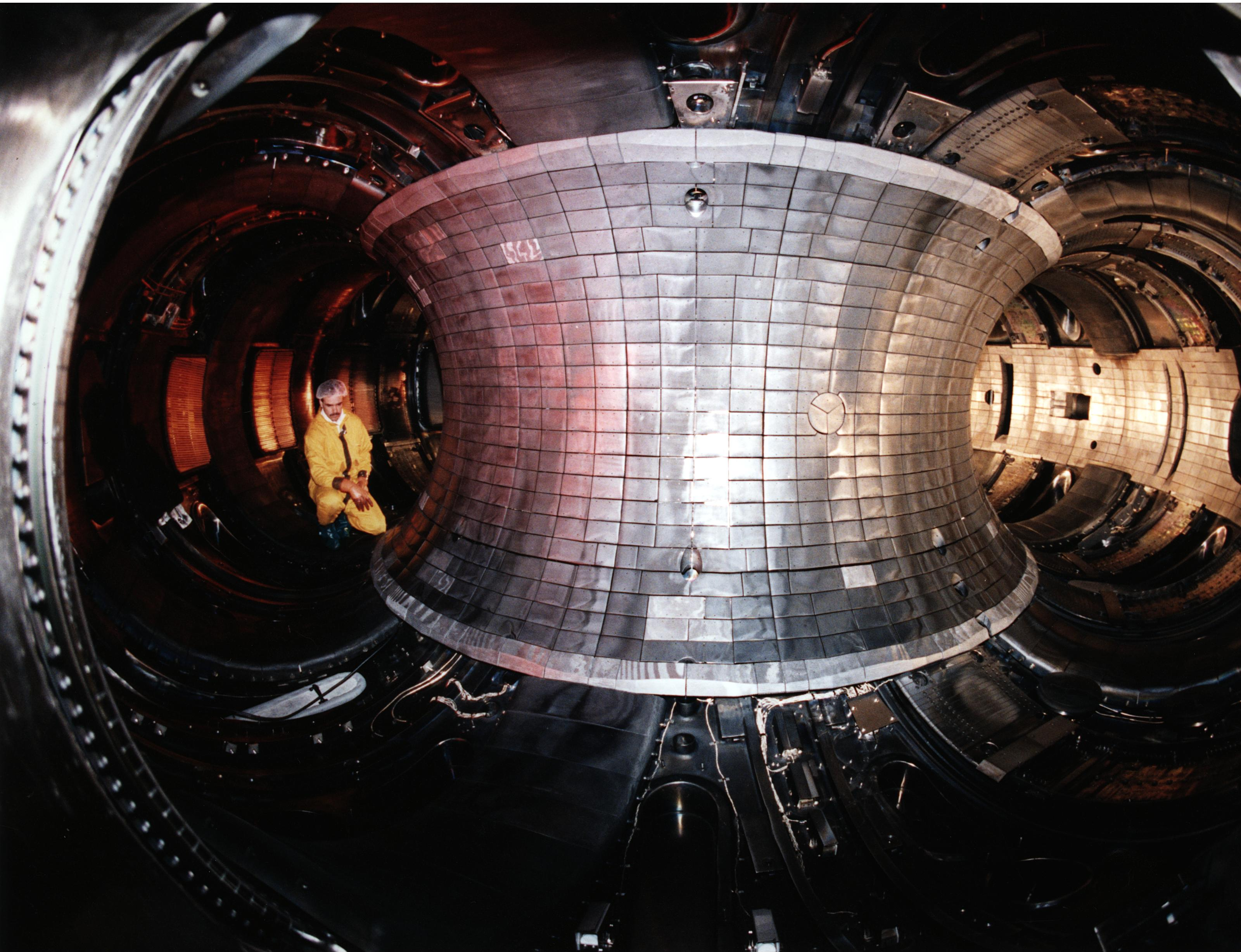
Inside the TFTR plasma vessel

After the success of PLT and other follow-on designs, the basic concept was considered well understood. PPPL began the design of a much larger successor to PLT that would demonstrate plasma burning in pulsed operation.

In July 1974, the Department of Energy (DOE) held a large meeting that was attended by all the major fusion labs. Notable among the attendees was Marshall Rosenbluth, a theorist who had a habit of studying machines and finding a variety of new instabilities that would ruin confinement. To everyone's surprise, at this meeting he failed to raise any new concerns. It appeared that the path to break-even was clear.

The last step before the attack on break-even would be to make a reactor that ran on a mixture of deuterium and tritium, as opposed to earlier machines which ran on deuterium alone. This was because tritium was both radioactive and easily absorbed in the body, presenting safety issues that made it expensive to use. It was widely believed that the performance of a machine running on deuterium alone would be basically identical to one running on D-T, but this assumption needed to be tested. Looking over the designs presented at the meeting, the DOE team chose the Princeton design.

Bob Hirsch, who recently took over the DOE steering committee, wanted to build the test machine at Oak Ridge National Laboratory (ORNL), but others in the department convinced him it would make more sense to do so at PPPL. They argued that a Princeton team would be more involved than an ORNL team running someone else's design. If an engineering prototype of a commercial system followed, that could be built at Oak Ridge. They gave the project the name TFTR and went to Congress for funding, which was granted in January 1975. Conceptual design work was carried out throughout 1975, and detailed design began the next year.

TFTR would be the largest tokamak in the world; for comparison, the original ST had a plasma diameter of 12 inches (300 mm), while the follow-on PLT design was 36 inches (910 mm), and the TFTR was designed to be 86 inches (2,200 mm). This made it roughly double the size of other large-scale machines of the era; the 1978 Joint European Torus and roughly concurrent JT-60 were both about half the diameter.

As PLT continued to generate better and better results, in 1978 and 79, additional funding was added and the design amended to reach the long-sought goal of "scientific breakeven" when the amount of power produced by the fusion reactions in the plasma was equal to the amount of power being fed into it to heat it to operating temperatures. Also known as Q = 1, this is an important step on the road to useful power-producing designs. To meet this requirement, the heating system was upgraded to 50 MW, and finally to 80 MW.

=== Operations ===
Construction began in 1980 and TFTR began initial operations in 1982. A lengthy period of break-in and testing followed. By the mid-1980s, tests with deuterium began in earnest in order to understand its performance. In 1986 it produced the first 'supershots' which produced many fusion neutrons. These demonstrated that the system could reach the goals of the initial 1976 design; the performance when running on deuterium was such that if tritium was introduced it was expected to produce about 3.5 MW of fusion power. Given the energy in the heating systems, this represented a Q_{DT} of about 0.2, or about only 20% of the requirement for break-even. The highest value of Q_{DT} achieved in deuterium-tritium plasmas was 0.28 (discharge 80539), and the central value, Q_{core} defined as the ratio of the fusion energy produced in the core to the applied heating power reaching the core, equals 0.8. The core heating power is deduced from the measured D-T fusion reaction rate profile, and the applied heating power is calculated using the TRANSP plasma analysis code.

During the three years of operation TFTR created 1.6 GJ fusion energy. The peak fusion power P_{fus} was 10.3 MW from 3.7 × 10 18 reactions per second, and peak fusion energy created in one discharge was 7.6 MJ.

Further testing revealed significant problems, however. To reach break-even, the system would have to meet several goals at the same time, a combination of temperature, density and the length of time the fuel is confined. In April 1986, TFTR experiments demonstrated the last two of these requirements when it produced a fusion triple product of 1.5 x 10^{14} Kelvin seconds per cubic centimeter, which is close to the goal for a practical reactor and five to seven times what is needed for breakeven. However, this occurred at a temperature that was far below what would be required. In July 1986, TFTR achieved a plasma temperature of 200 million kelvin (200 MK), at that time the highest ever reached in a laboratory. The temperature is 10 times greater than the center of the Sun, and more than enough for breakeven. Unfortunately, to reach these temperatures the triple product had been greatly reduced to 10^{13}, two or three times too small for break-even.

Major efforts to reach these conditions simultaneously continued. Donald Grove, TFTR project manager, said they expected to achieve that goal in 1987. This would be followed with D-T tests that would actually produce breakeven, beginning in 1989. Unfortunately, the system was unable to meet any of these goals. The reasons for these problems were intensively studied over the following years, leading to a new understanding of the instabilities of high-performance plasmas that had not been seen in smaller machines. A major outcome of TFTR's troubles was the development of highly non-uniform plasma cross-sections, notably the D-shaped plasmas that now dominate the field.

=== Later experiments ===
Although it became clear that TFTR would not reach break-even, experiments using tritium began in earnest in December 1993, the first such device to move primarily to this fuel. In 1994 it produced a then world-record of 10.7 megawatts of fusion power from a 50-50 D-T plasma (exceeded at JET in the UK, which generated 16MW from 24MW of injected thermal power input in 1997). The two experiments had emphasized the alpha particles produced in the deuterium-tritium reactions, which are important for self-heating of the plasma and an important part of any operational design. In 1995, TFTR attained a world-record temperature of 510 million °C - more than 25 times that at the center of the sun. This later was beaten the following year by the JT-60 Tokamak which achieved an ion temperature of 522 million °C (45 keV). Also In 1995, TFTR scientists explored a new fundamental mode of plasma confinement -- enhanced reversed shear, to reduce plasma turbulence.

TFTR remained in use until 1997. It was dismantled in September 2002, after 15 years of operation.

It was followed by the NSTX spherical tokamak.

== See also ==
- List of fusion experiments
