= Magnetic confinement fusion =

Approach to controlled thermonuclear fusion using magnetic fields

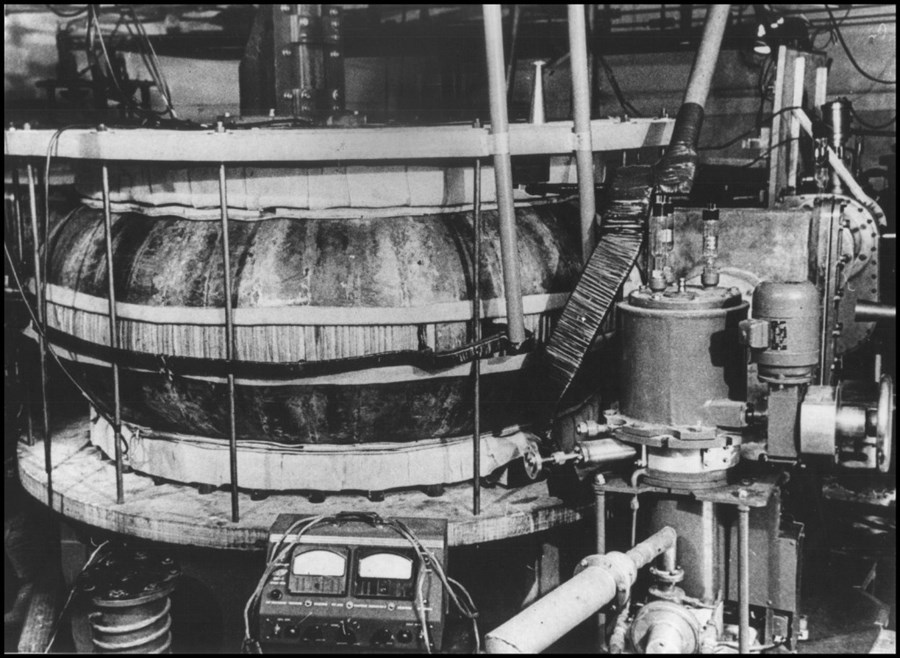
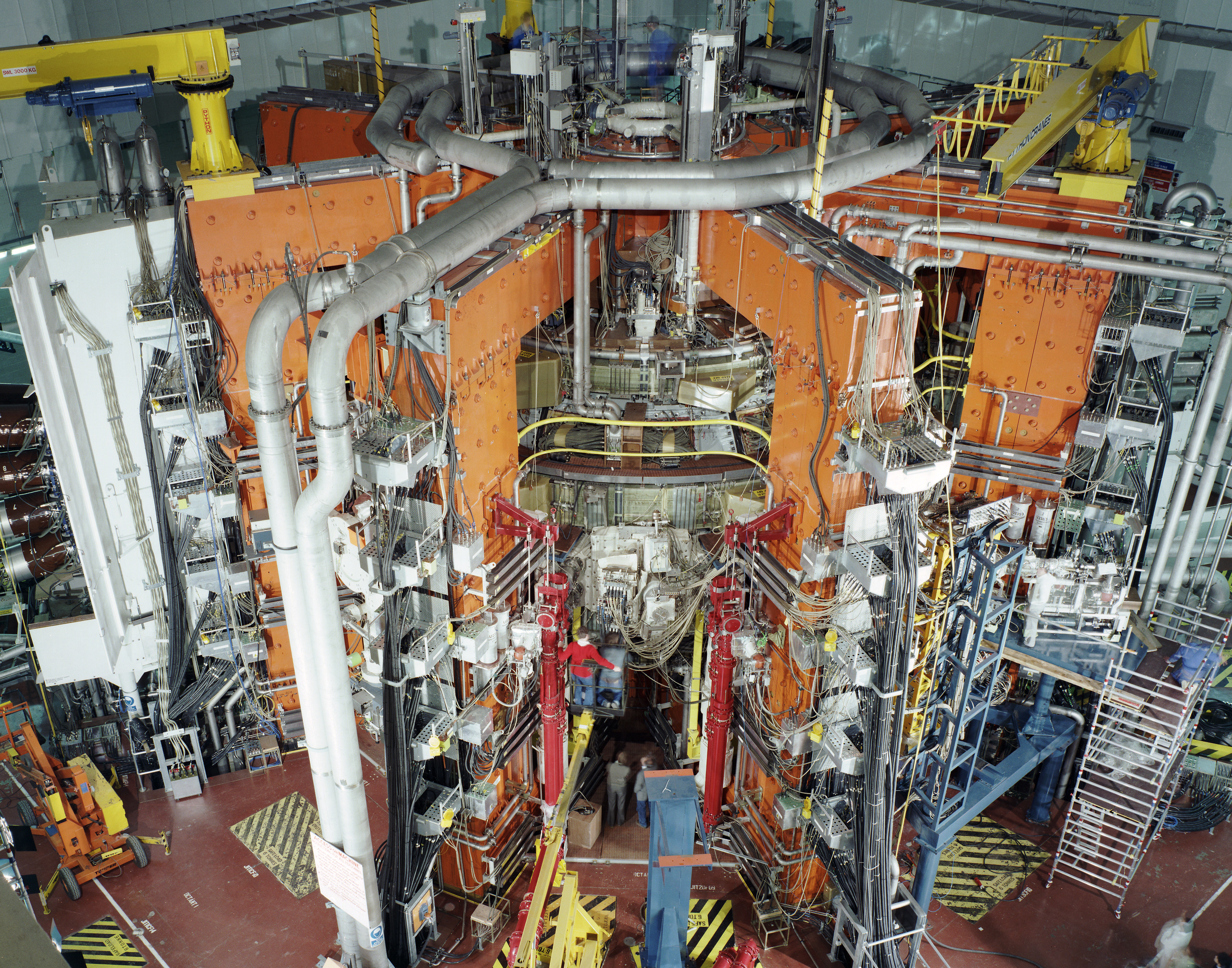
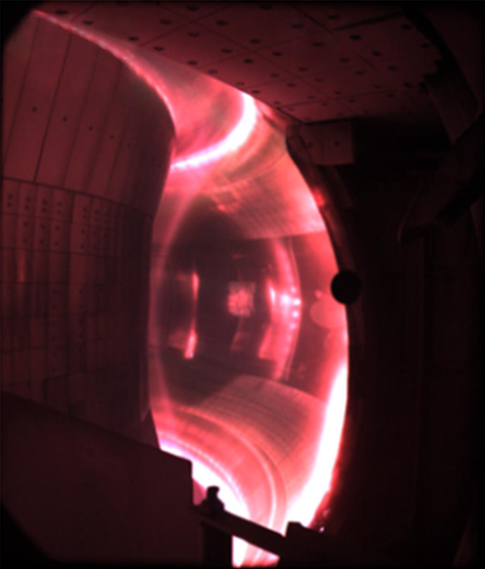
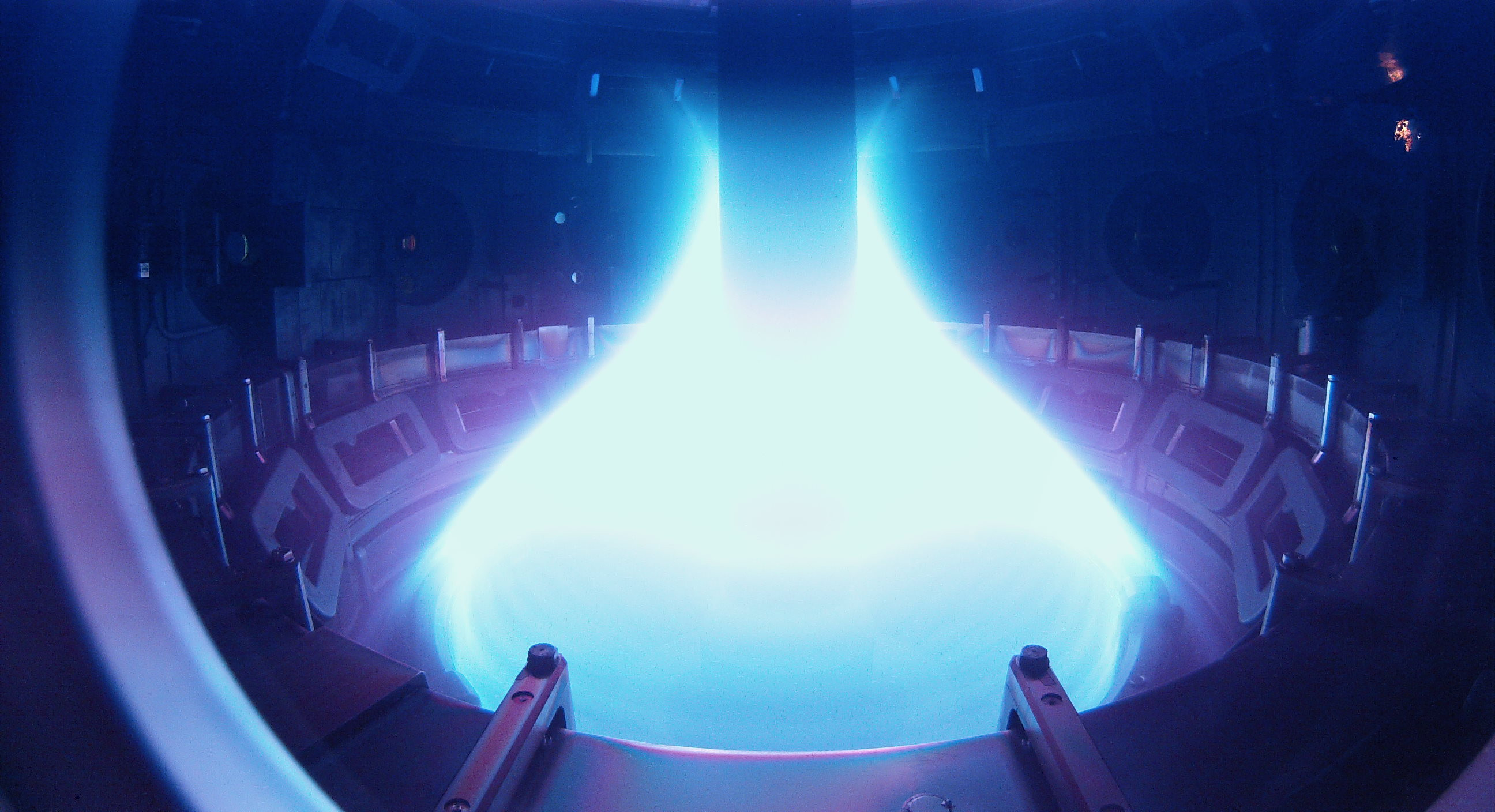
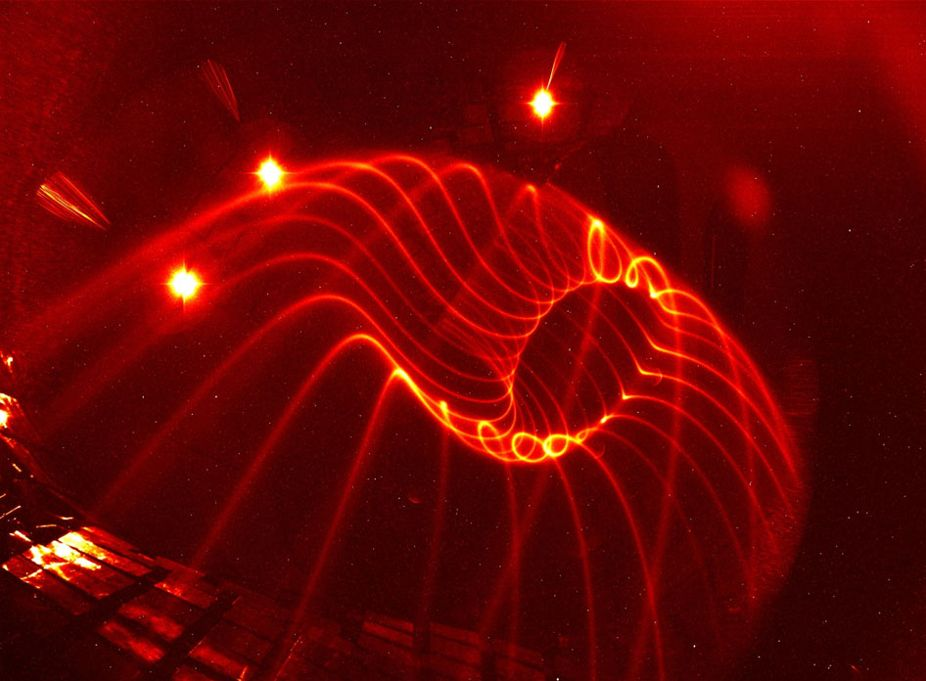
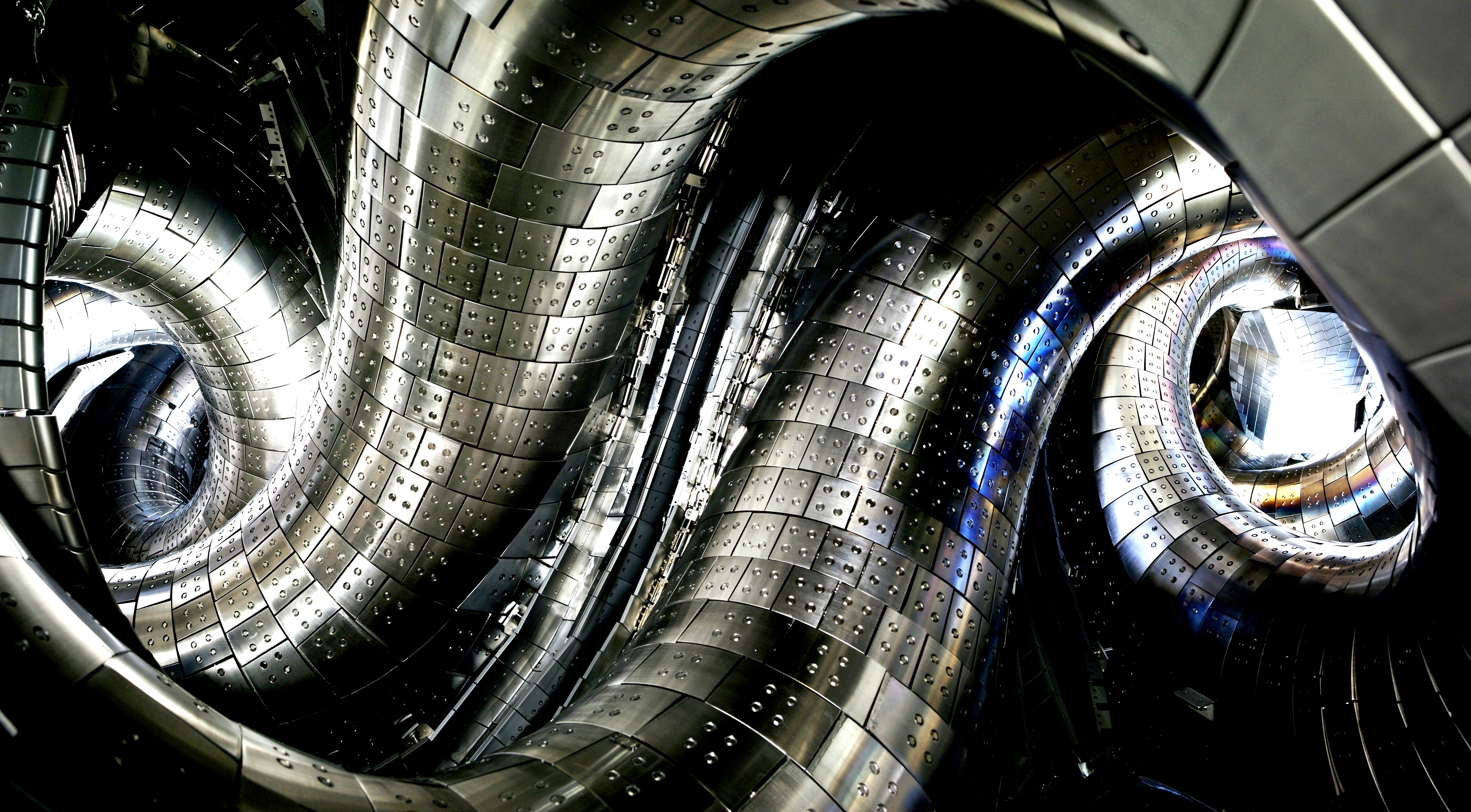
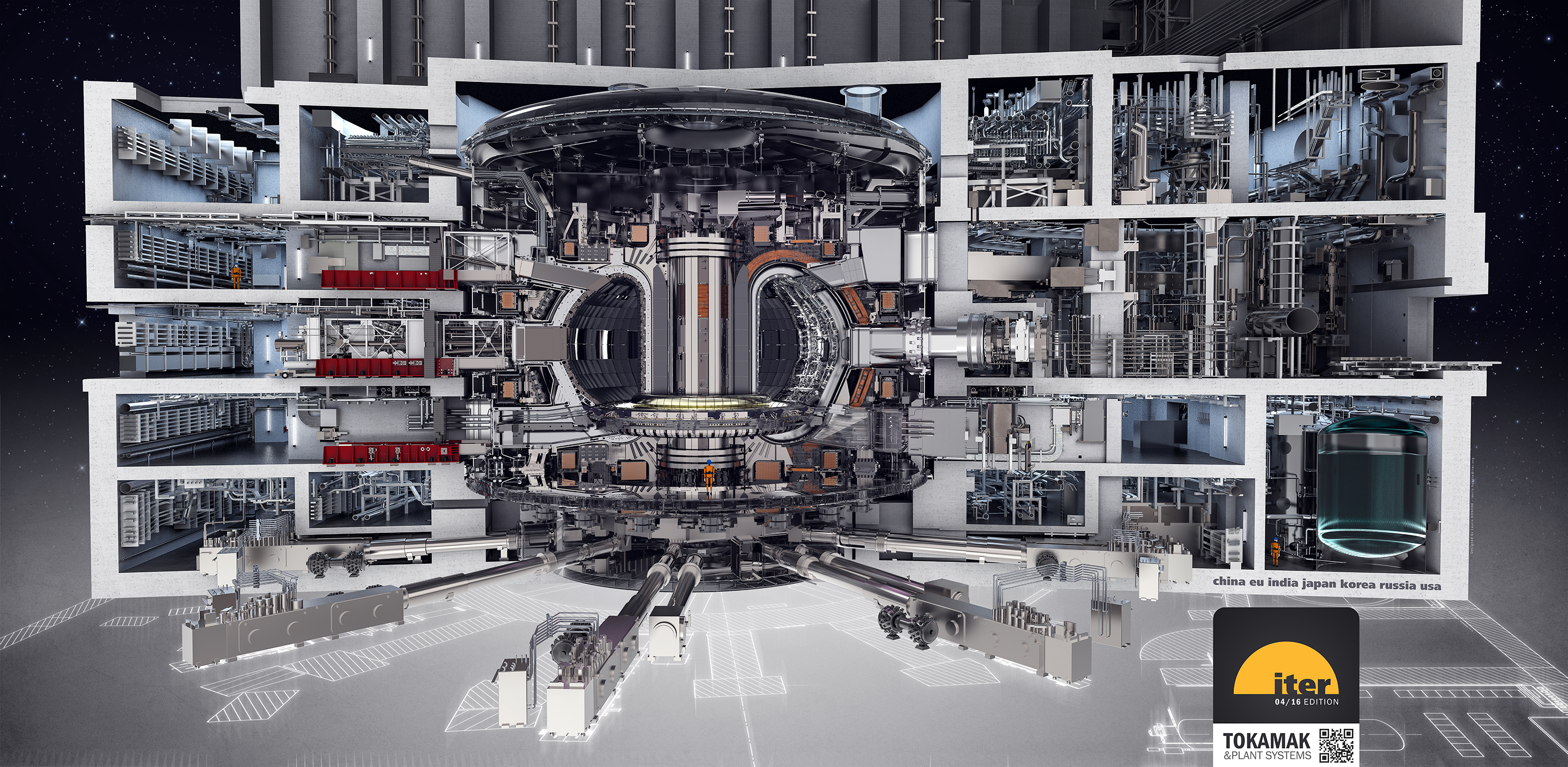
From top, left to right
1. T-1, the first tokamak device, USSR
2. Joint European Torus, a landmark tokamak, UK
3. Fusion plasma in a modern tokamak, EAST, China
4. MAST, a spherical tokamak, UK
5. Magnetic field lines in Wendelstein 7-X, the largest stellarator, Germany
6. Interior of the Large Helical Device stellarator, Japan
7. ITER, the largest MCF experiment, scheduled to operate from 2034 in France

Magnetic confinement fusion (MCF) is an approach to generate thermonuclear fusion power that uses magnetic fields to confine fusion fuel in the form of a plasma. Magnetic confinement is one of two major branches of controlled fusion research, along with inertial confinement fusion.

Fusion reactions for reactors usually combine light atomic nuclei of deuterium and tritium to form an alpha particle (helium-4 nucleus) and a neutron, where the energy is released in the form of the kinetic energy of the reaction products. In order to overcome the electrostatic repulsion between the nuclei, the fuel must have a temperature of hundreds of millions of kelvin, at which the fuel is fully ionized and becomes a plasma. In addition, the plasma must be at a sufficient density, and the energy must remain in the reacting region for a sufficient time, as specified by the Lawson criterion (triple product). The high temperature of a fusion plasma precludes the use of material vessels for direct containment. Magnetic confinement fusion attempts to use the physics of charged particle motion to contain the plasma particles by applying strong magnetic fields.

Tokamaks and stellarators are the two leading MCF device candidates as of today. Investigation of using various magnetic configurations to confine fusion plasma began in the 1950s. Early simple mirror and toroidal machines showed disappointing results of low confinement. After the declassification of fusion research by the United States, United Kingdom and Soviet Union in 1958, a breakthrough on toroidal devices was reported by the Kurchatov Institute. Its tokamak demonstrated a temperature over around 10 million kelvin and milliseconds of confinement time, and was confirmed by a visiting British team. Since then, tokamaks became the dominant line of research globally with JET, TFTR and JT-60 being constructed and operated. The ITER tokamak experiment under construction, which aims to demonstrate scientific breakeven, will be the world's largest MCF device.

Experiments with deuterium-tritium plasmas in TFTR created 1.6 GJ fusion energy during 1993-1996. The peak fusion power was 10.3 MW from 3.7 x 10^{18} reactions per second, and peak fusion energy created in one discharge was 7.6 MJ. Subsequent experiments in JET achieved a peak fusion power of 16 MW (5.8 x 10^{18} /s) during DTE1 , and a discharge producing 69 MJ during the recent DTE3 (consuming 0.2 mgm of D and T).

The current record of fusion power generated by MCF devices is held by JET. In 2021, JET sustained a gain factor of Q = 0.33 for 5 seconds and produced 59 megajoules of energy. The record for the gain factor was 0.67 achieved in 1997, and the gain in the plasma core Q_{core} for that discharge is calculated to be 1.3, using the TRANSP integrated modeling code.

While early stellarators of low confinement in the 1950s were overshadowed by the initial success of tokamaks, interests in stellarators re-emerged owing to their inherent capability for steady-state and disruption-free operation, distinct from tokamaks. The world's largest stellarator experiment, Wendelstein 7-X, began operation in 2015.

One of the challenges of MCF research is the development and extrapolation of plasma scenarios to power plant conditions, where good fusion performance and energy confinement must be maintained. Potential solutions to other problems such as divertor power exhaust, mitigation of transients (disruptions, runaway electrons, edge-localized modes), handling of neutron flux, tritium breeding and the physics of burning plasmas are being actively studied. Development of new technologies in plasma diagnostics, real-time control, plasma-facing materials, high-power microwave sources, vacuum engineering, cryogenics and superconducting magnets are essential in MCF research.

== Types ==
=== Magnetic mirrors ===
A major area of research in the early years of fusion energy research was the magnetic mirror. Most early mirror devices attempted to confine plasma near the focus of a non-planar magnetic field generated in a solenoid, with the field strength increased at either end of the tube. In order to escape the confinement area, nuclei had to enter a small annular area near each magnet. It was known that nuclei would escape through this area, but by adding and heating fuel continually it was believed this could be overcome.

In 1954, Edward Teller gave a talk in which he outlined a theoretical problem that suggested the plasma would also quickly escape sideways through the confinement fields. This would occur in any machine with convex magnetic fields, which existed in the centre of the mirror area. Existing machines were having other problems and it was not obvious whether this was occurring. In 1961, a Soviet team conclusively demonstrated this flute instability was indeed occurring, and when a US team stated they were not seeing this issue, the Soviets examined their experiment and noted this was due to a simple instrumentation error.

The Soviet team also introduced a potential solution, in the form of "Ioffe bars". These bent the plasma into a new shape that was concave at all points, avoiding the problem Teller had pointed out. This demonstrated a clear improvement in confinement. A UK team then introduced a simpler arrangement of these magnets they called the "tennis ball", which was taken up in the US as the "baseball". Several baseball series machines were tested and showed much-improved performance. However, theoretical calculations showed that the maximum amount of energy they could produce would be about the same as the energy needed to run the magnets. As a power-producing machine, the mirror appeared to be a dead end.

In the 1970s, a solution was developed. By placing a baseball coil at either end of a large solenoid, the entire assembly could hold a much larger volume of plasma, and thus produce more energy. Plans began to build a large device of this "tandem mirror" design, which became the Mirror Fusion Test Facility (MFTF). Having never tried this layout before, a smaller machine, the Tandem Mirror Experiment (TMX) was built to test this layout. TMX demonstrated a new series of problems that suggested MFTF would not reach its performance goals, and during construction MFTF was modified to MFTF-B. However, due to budget cuts, one day after the construction of MFTF was completed it was mothballed. Mirrors have seen little development since that time.

=== Toroidal machines ===
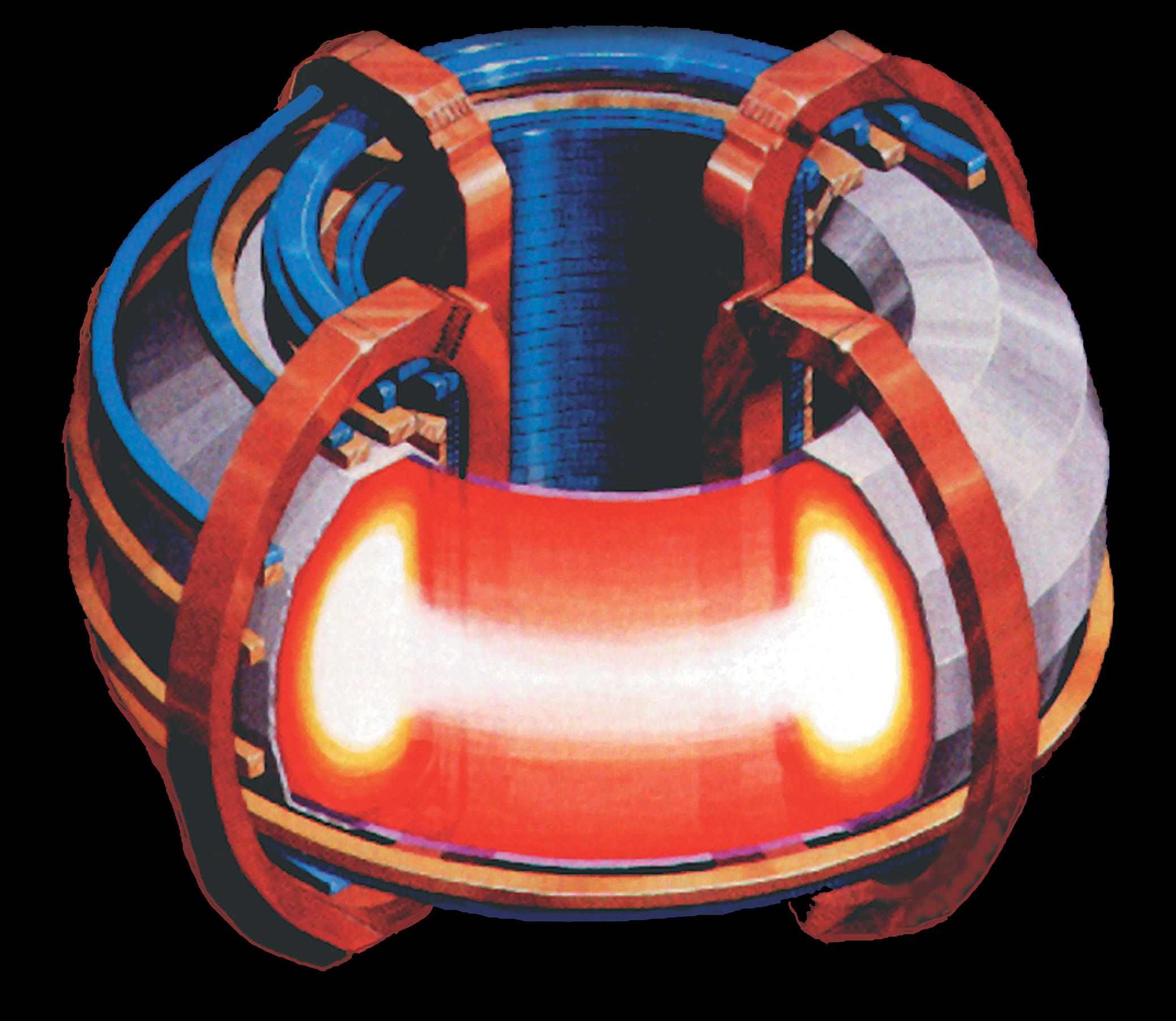
Concept of a toroidal fusion reactor

==== Z-pinch ====
The first real effort to build a controlled fusion reactor used the pinch effect in a toroidal container. A large transformer wrapping the container was used to induce a current in the plasma inside. This current creates a magnetic field that squeezes the plasma into a thin ring, thus "pinching" it. The combination of Joule heating by the current and adiabatic heating as it pinches raises the temperature of the plasma to the required range in the tens of millions of degrees Kelvin.

First built in the UK in 1948, and followed by a series of increasingly large and powerful machines in the UK and US, all early machines proved subject to powerful instabilities in the plasma. Notable among them was the kink instability, which caused the pinched ring to thrash about and hit the walls of the container long before it reached the required temperatures. The concept was so simple, however, that herculean effort was expended to address these issues.

This led to the "stabilized pinch" concept, which added external magnets to "give the plasma a backbone" while it compressed. The largest such machine was the UK's ZETA reactor, completed in 1957, which appeared to successfully produce fusion. Only a few months after its public announcement in January 1958, these claims had to be retracted when it was discovered the neutrons being seen were created by new instabilities in the plasma mass. Further studies showed any such design would be beset with similar problems, and research using the z-pinch approach largely ended.

==== Stellarators ====
An early attempt to build a magnetic confinement system was the stellarator, introduced by Lyman Spitzer in 1951. Essentially, the stellarator consists of a torus that has been cut in half and then attached back together with straight "crossover" sections to form a figure-8. This has the effect of propagating the nuclei from the inside to outside as it orbits the device, thereby cancelling out the drift across the axis, at least if the nuclei orbit fast enough.

Not long after the construction of the earliest figure-8 machines, it was noted that the same effect could be achieved in a completely circular arrangement by adding a second set of helically-wound magnets on either side. This arrangement generated a field that extended only part way into the plasma, which proved to have the significant advantage of adding "shear", which suppressed turbulence in the plasma. However, as larger devices were built on this model, it was seen that plasma was escaping from the system much more rapidly than expected, much more rapidly than could be replaced.

By the mid-1960s it appeared the stellarator approach was a dead end. In addition to the fuel loss problems, it was also calculated that a power-producing machine based on this system would be enormous, the better part of a thousand feet (300 meters) long. When the tokamak showed exceptional performance in 1968, interest in the stellarator vanished in the USA, whose latest design at Princeton University, the Model C, was converted to the Symmetric Tokamak in 1970. Stellarator research continued in Germany, the Soviet Union, and Japan.

Stellarators have seen renewed interest since the turn of the millennium as they avoid several problems subsequently found in the tokamak. Newer models have been built, but these remain about two generations behind the latest tokamak designs.

While stellarators, today, are less widely used and built than tokamaks, they are still attractive for their steady-state operation and reduced risk of plasma disruptions, as compared to tokamaks. However, their main disadvantage is the higher complexity in building the systems as well as having lower energy confinement when compared to similar tokamaks. However, more recent studies have found a new family of stellarator magnetic-field designs that try to discount these setbacks. With advanced optimization techniques, researchers have found ways to better confine the particles to reach the energy confinement closer to tokamaks. Additionally, these new designs maintain the steady, stable benefits of stellarators. The results build upon the Wendelstein 7-X experiment which demonstrated similar qualities with a stellarator. Increasing research and design allow researchers to refine magnetic geometries that were previously too complex, which may lead to a new generation of stellarator reactors to compete directly with the industry dominant tokamaks.

==== Tokamaks ====
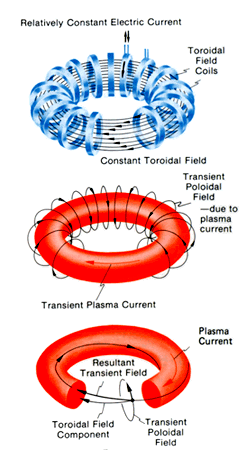
Tokamak magnetic fields.

In the late 1950s, Soviet researchers noticed that the kink instability would be strongly suppressed if the twists in the path were strong enough that a particle traveled around the circumference of the inside of the chamber more rapidly than around the chamber's length. This would require the pinch current to be reduced and the external stabilizing magnets to be made much stronger.

In 1968 Soviet research on the T-3 tokamak was presented at the 3rd IAEA international fusion energy conference, with results that far outstripped existing efforts from any competing machine. Since then, the majority of effort in magnetic confinement has been based on the tokamak principle. In the tokamak, a current is periodically driven through the plasma itself, creating a field "around" the torus that combines with the toroidal field to produce a winding field, in some ways similar to that in a modern stellarator (in that nuclei move from the inside to the outside of the device as they flow around it).

In 1991, START was built at Culham, UK, as the first purpose-built spherical tokamak. This was essentially a spheromak with an inserted central rod. START produced impressive results, with β values at approximately 40% - three times that produced by standard tokamaks at the time. The concept has been scaled up to higher plasma currents and larger sizes, with the experiments NSTX (US), MAST (UK) and Globus-M (Russia) currently running. Spherical tokamaks have improved stability properties compared to conventional tokamaks and as such the area is receiving considerable experimental attention. However, spherical tokamaks to date have been at low toroidal field and as such are impractical for fusion neutron devices.

A recent bibliometric and patent trend analysis studied the global development and research of tokamak technology in the decade prior to 2024. The authors highlight China, South Korea, and Japan as the top contributors in the previous decade, focusing on superconducting magnets in high temperatures. Another emerging area of research in the latter half of this study's dates is artificial intelligence and machine learning control. Researchers have utilized AI and machine learning resources to predict and control plasma stability. Ultimately, the industry seems to be heading towards the commercial realm, considering the study's findings on patent trends, suggesting potential industrialization with tokamak system fusion technologies. Collectively, the research points towards a more practical, steady operation in future reactors.

In tokamak reactors, operational regimes (or modes in which a system operates) are a critical focus in their design. High-confinement mode (H-mode) has led to great success in reaching high energy gain; however, it is always accompanied by edge-localized modes (ELMs), which have the potential to damage plasma-facing components. One alternative regime, I-mode, offers improved confinement without the ELMs and instabilities on the edges. However, I-mode had only been found in tiny, short pulses. In 2023, researchers operating the Experimental Advanced Superconducting Tokamak (EAST) achieved what they called "Super I-mode." Super I-mode both improved confinement, as well as the duration of confinement to over 1000 seconds: one of the longest improved-confinement discharges ever observed in a tokamak system. Super I-mode also was found to maintain all of the benefits of I-mode while extending the duration of the pulses, making a massive step towards steady operation that would be needed in a power plant. These findings may be the first step in overcoming the limitations of H-mode and the ELMs that accompany H-mode.

==== Compact toroids ====
Compact toroids, such as the field-reversed configuration or the spheromak, attempt to combine the improved confinement of closed magnetic surface configurations with the simplicity of machines with no central core. An early experiment of this type in the 1970s was Trisops, which formed two theta pinch (θ-pinch) rings and fired them toward each other.

Although tokamaks and stellarators dominate the magnetic confinement fusion field of research, other configurations are also being researched to explore possible alternatives. Field-reversed configurations (FRCs) are one example of compact toroidal devices that do not require large external toroidal coils. The Norman device, a recently proposed configuration, seemed to address many stability issues that have limited FRC success. Relative to previous approaches with FRCs, Norman may enable one hundred times more power at a fraction of the cost. FRCs also operate with alternative fuel sources such as proton-boron-11, compared to deuterium tritium used in tokamak systems. While Norman, and other FRCs like it are in early stages of research and the claim has yet to be proven, it is a step towards smaller, simpler, and more cost-effective reactors that could compete with the industry dominating tokamaks and stellarators.

=== Other ===
Some more novel configurations produced in toroidal machines are the reversed field pinch and the Levitated Dipole Experiment.

The US Navy has also claimed a "Plasma Compression Fusion Device" capable of TW power levels in a 2018 US patent filing:

"It is a feature of the present invention to provide a plasma compression fusion device that can produce power in the gigawatt to terawatt range (and higher), with input power in the kilowatt to megawatt range."

However, the patent has since been abandoned.

== Magnetic fusion energy ==
All of these devices have faced considerable problems being scaled up and in their approach toward the Lawson criterion. One researcher has described the magnetic confinement problem in simple terms, likening it to squeezing a balloon – the air will always attempt to "pop out" somewhere else. Turbulence in the plasma has proven to be a major problem, causing the plasma to escape the confinement area, and potentially touch the walls of the container. If this happens, a process known as "sputtering" will take place, wherein high-mass particles from the container walls (often steel and other metals) are mixed into the fusion plasma, lowering its temperature.

In 1997, scientists at the Joint European Torus (JET) facilities in the UK produced 16 megawatts of fusion power. Scientists can now exercise a measure of control over plasma turbulence and resultant energy leakage, long considered an unavoidable and intractable feature of plasmas. There is increased optimism that the plasma pressure above which the plasma disassembles can now be made large enough to sustain a fusion reaction rate acceptable for a power plant. Electromagnetic waves can be injected and steered to manipulate the paths of plasma particles, and then to produce the large electrical currents necessary to generate the magnetic fields to confine the plasma. These and other control capabilities have come from advances in basic understanding of plasma science in such areas as plasma turbulence, plasma macroscopic stability, and plasma wave propagation. Much of this progress has been achieved with a particular emphasis on the tokamak.

== Recent developments ==
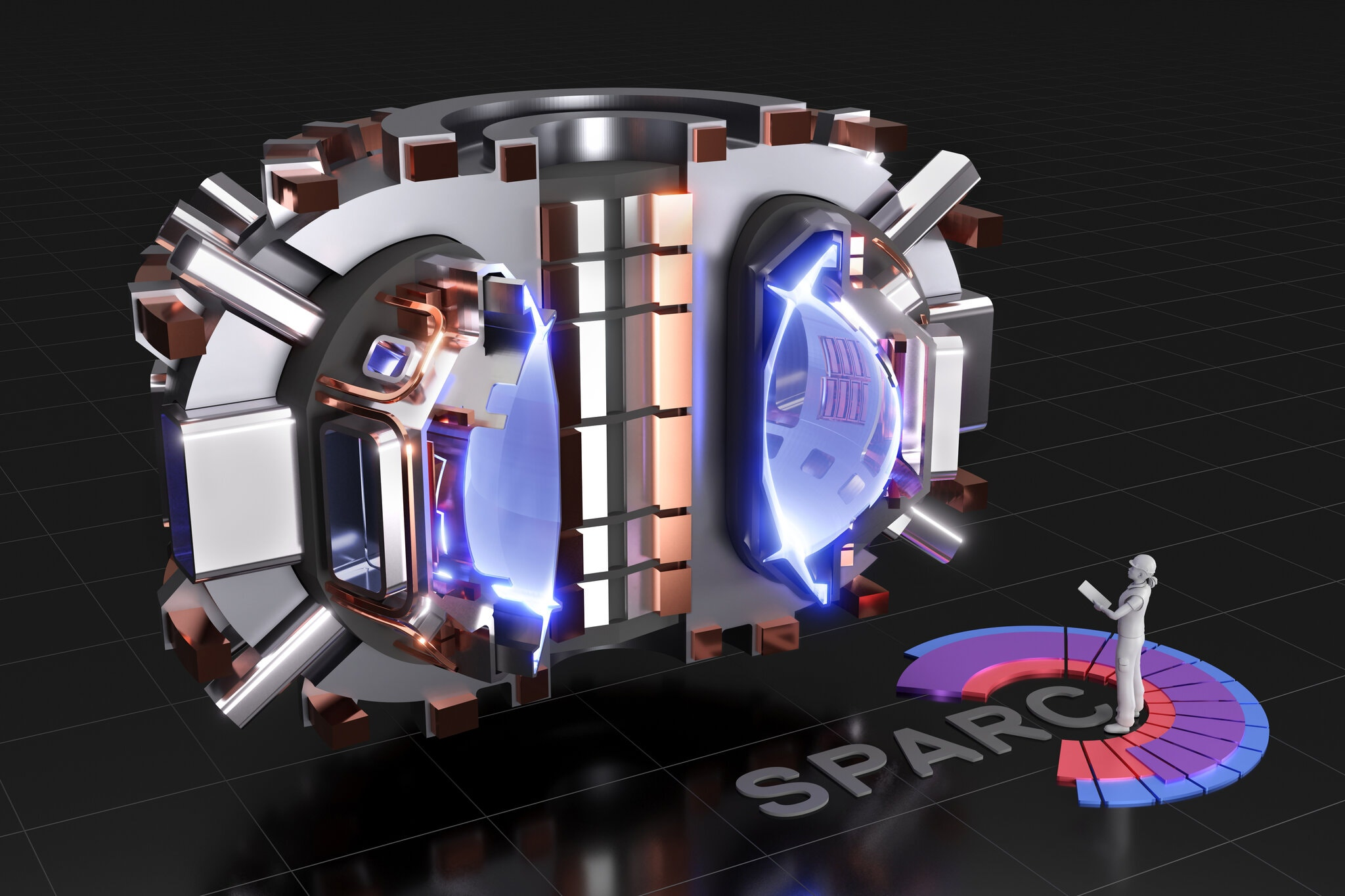
Cutaway view of the current design for the SPARC reactor

SPARC is a tokamak using deuterium–tritium (DT) fuel, currently being designed at the MIT Plasma Science and Fusion Center in collaboration with Commonwealth Fusion Systems with the goal of producing a practical reactor design in the near future. In late 2020, a special issue of the Journal of Plasma Physics was published including seven studies speaking to a high level of confidence in the efficacy of the reactor design focusing on using simulations to validate predictions for the operation and capacity of the reactor. One study focused on modeling the magnetohydrodynamic (MHD) conditions in the reactor. The stability of this condition will define the limits of plasma pressure that can be achieved under varying magnetic field pressures.

The progress made with SPARC has built off previously-mentioned work on the ITER project, and is aiming to utilize new technology in high-temperature superconductors (HTS) as a more practical material. HTS will enable reactor magnets to produce greater magnetic field and will proportionally increase the transport processes necessary to generate energy. One of the largest material considerations is ensuring the inner wall will be able to handle the intense amounts of heat that will be generated (expected to approach 10 GW per square meter in heat flux from the plasma). Not only does this material need to survive, but it needs to withstand damage enough to avoid contaminating the core plasma. These material challenges are being actively considered and accounted for in the models and predictive calculations used in the design process.

Progress has been made in addressing the challenge of core-edge integration in future fusion reactors at the DIII-D National Fusion Facility. For a burning fusion plasma, it is crucial to maintain a plasma core temperature of millions of degrees Kelvin, without damaging the reactor walls. Injecting impurities which are (atomically) heavier than the plasma particles into the plasma and power exhaust region (the Divertor) is crucial for cooling the plasma boundary without affecting the fusion performance. Conventional experiments used gaseous impurities, but the injection of boron, boron nitride, and lithium in powder form has also been tested. Experiments showed effective cooling of the plasma boundary with minimal impact on the performance of high-confinement mode plasmas. This approach could be applied to larger fusion devices like ITER and contribute to core-edge integration in future fusion power plants. Recent experiments have also made progress in disruption prediction, ELM control, and material migration. The program is installing additional tools to optimize tokamak operation and exploring edge plasma and materials interactions. Major upgrades are being considered to enhance performance and flexibility for future fusion reactors.

The Wendelstein 7-X stellarator at the Max Planck Institute for Plasma Physics in Germany has finished its first plasma campaigns and underwent upgrades, including the installation of over 8,000 graphite wall tiles and ten divertor modules to protect the vessel walls and enable longer plasma discharges. The experiments will test the optimized concept of Wendelstein 7-X as a stellarator fusion device for potential use in a power plant. The island divertor plays a crucial role in regulating plasma purity and density. Wendelstein 7-X allows the investigation into plasma turbulence and the effectiveness of magnetic confinement and thermal insulation. The device's microwave heating system has also been improved to achieve higher energy throughput and plasma density. These advancements aim to demonstrate the suitability of stellarators for continuous fusion power generation.

TAE Technologies achieved 2022 a significant research milestone by conducting the first-ever hydrogen-boron fusion experiments in a magnetically confined fusion plasma. The experiments were conducted in collaboration with Japan's National Institute for Fusion Science using a boron powder injection system developed by scientists and engineers of the Princeton Plasma Physics Laboratory. TAE's pursuit of hydrogen-boron fusion aims to develop a clean, cost-competitive, and sustainable fuel cycle for fusion power. The results suggest that a hydrogen-boron fuel mix has the potential to be used in utility-scale fusion power. TAE Technologies is focused on developing a fusion power plant by the mid-2030s that will produce clean electricity.

The private U.S. nuclear fusion company Helion Energy has signed a deal with Microsoft to provide electricity in about five years, marking the first such agreement for fusion power. Helion's plant, expected to be online by 2028, aims to generate 50 megawatts or more of power. The company plans to use helium-3, a rare gas as a fuel source.

Kronos Fusion Energy has announced the development of an aneutronic fusion energy generator for clean and limitless power in national defense.

In May 2023, the United States Department of Energy (DOE) announced a $46 million grant for eight companies across seven states to advance fusion power plant designs and research, aiming to establish the U.S. as a leader in clean fusion energy. The funding from the Milestone-Based Fusion Development Program supports the goal to demonstrate pilot-scale fusion within ten years and achieve a net-zero economy by 2050. The grant recipients will tackle scientific and technological hurdles to create viable fusion pilot plant designs in the next 5–10 years. The awardees include Commonwealth Fusion Systems, Focused Energy Inc., Princeton Stellarators Inc., Realta Fusion Inc., Tokamak Energy Inc., Type One Energy Group, Xcimer Energy Inc., and Zap Energy Inc.

== Engineering challenges ==
Generating strong and stable magnetic fields remains the primary and most demanding challenge of engineering for magnetic confinement fusion. Early machines used resistive copper magnets, but they used a lot of power and limited the duration of the plasma discharges (energy). Later, niobium-titanium and niobium-tin, which are low temperature superconductors, allowed the creation of longer duration tokamaks like EAST and ITER. Reliance still depends on high-temperature superconductors (HTS) such as yttrium barium copper oxide (YBCO). Materials such as these can operate in higher magnetic fields and at more feasible and realistic cryogenic temperatures. This reduces energy demand and the complexity of the system itself. However, HTS magnets face their own engineering challenges, such as mechanical stress from Lorentz forces and ensuring quench protection for the large coils. Magnet technology is also vital to improving reactor performances, due to the fact that higher magnetic fields result in improved plasma confinement as well as the compactness of the reactor designs.

== Experimental laboratories ==
The world's major magnetic confinement fusion laboratories are:

- ASIPP (China). Its main facility is the EAST tokamak operated since 2006. It is the first tokamak to employ superconducting toroidal and poloidal magnets, and set several records in long-pulse high-parameter tokamak plasma operation.
- CEA Cadarache (France). It operates the WEST tokamak.
- Culham Centre for Fusion Energy (United Kingdom). It is the home of the Joint European Torus (JET) and the Mega Ampere Spherical Tokamak-Upgrade (MAST-U).
- Consorzio RFX in Padova (Italy). It operates the RFX device, the largest reverse field pinch experiment, and it also houses the ITER Neutral Beam Test Facility.
- EPFL Swiss Plasma Center (Switzerland). It operates the tokamak à configuration variable (TCV) which specializes in plasma shaping research.
- General Atomics (United States). It is currently operating the DIII-D tokamak.
- ITER (international). It is being built next to the Cadarache facility, in southern France.
- Max Planck Institute for Plasma Physics (Germany). Its main experimental facilities are the ASDEX Upgrade tokamak and the Wendelstein 7-X stellarator.
- MIT Plasma Science and Fusion Center (United States). It previously operated the Alcator C-Mod tokamak between 1991 and 2016, and is currently building the SPARC tokamak with Commonwealth Fusion Systems.
- Princeton Plasma Physics Laboratory (United States). Its primary fusion experiment is the National Spherical Torus Experiment-Upgrade (NSTX-U).
Operational fusion experiments worldwide.
- Purple: Tokamak-type experiments
- Blue: Stellarators
- Orange: Inertial confinement experiments
- Green: Reversed field pinch experiments

== See also ==
- Gas torus
- Magnetized Liner Inertial Fusion
