= Fusion energy gain factor =

Ratio of power produced to power needed

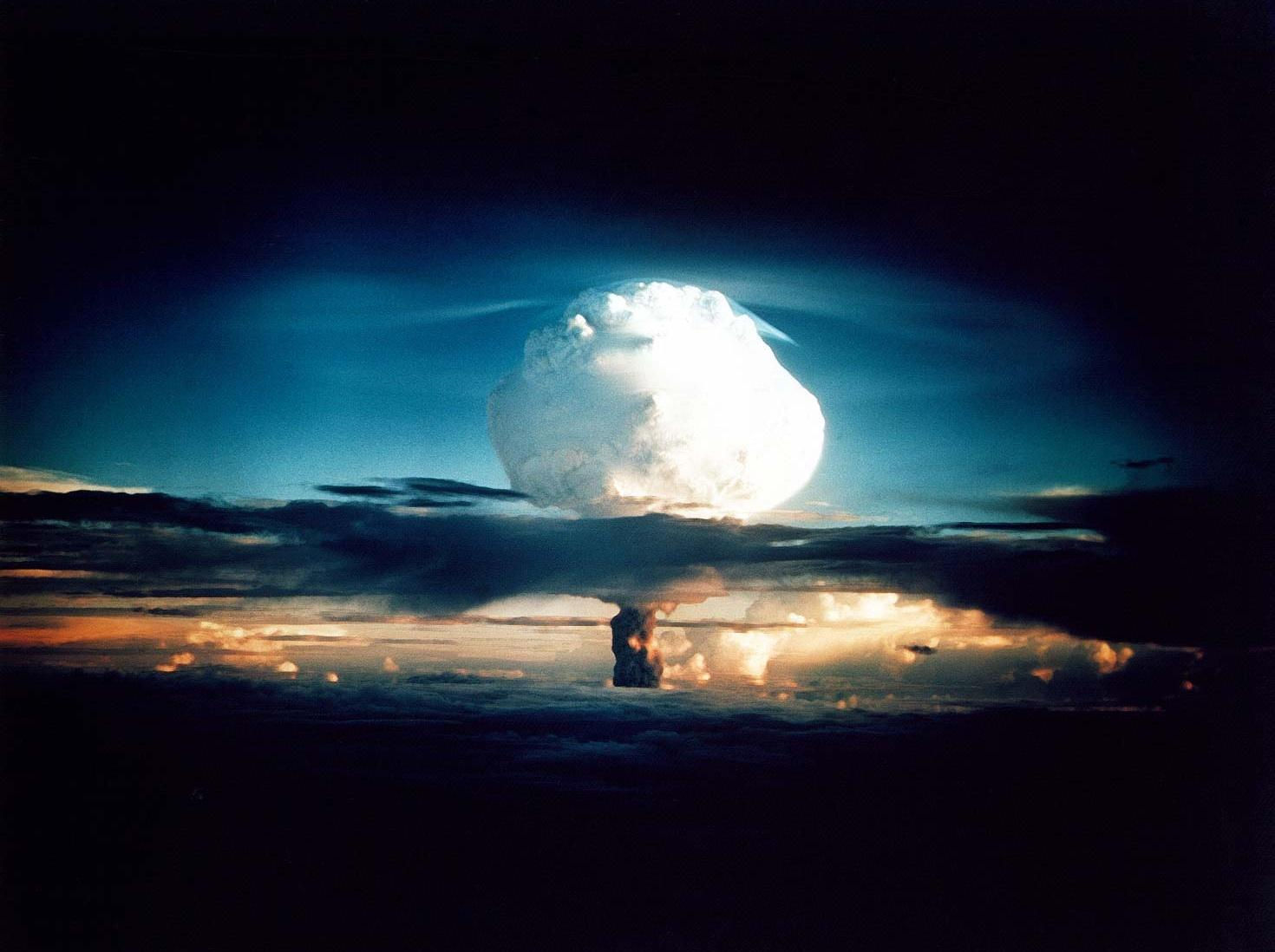
The explosion of the Ivy Mike hydrogen bomb. The hydrogen bomb was the first device able to achieve fusion energy gain factor significantly larger than 1.

A fusion energy gain factor, usually expressed with the symbol Q, is the ratio of fusion power produced in a nuclear fusion reactor to the power required to maintain the plasma in a steady state. The condition of Q = 1, when the power being released by the fusion reactions is equal to the required heating power, is referred to as breakeven, or in some sources, scientific breakeven.

The energy given off by the fusion reactions may be captured within the fuel, leading to self-heating. Most fusion reactions release at least some of their energy in a form that cannot be captured within the plasma, so a system at Q = 1 will cool without external heating. With typical fuels, self-heating in fusion reactors is not expected to match the external sources until at least Q ≈ 5. If Q increases past this point, increasing self-heating eventually removes the need for external heating. At this point the reaction becomes self-sustaining, a condition called ignition, and is generally regarded as highly desirable for practical reactor designs. Ignition corresponds to infinite Q.

Over time, several related terms have entered the fusion lexicon. Energy that is not captured within the fuel can be captured externally to produce electricity. That electricity can be used to heat the plasma to operational temperatures. A system that is self-powered in this way is referred to as running at engineering breakeven. Operating above engineering breakeven, a machine would produce more electricity than it uses and could sell that excess. One that sells enough electricity to cover its operating costs is sometimes known as economic breakeven. Additionally, fusion fuels, especially tritium, are very expensive, so many experiments run on various test gasses like hydrogen or deuterium. A reactor running on these fuels that reaches the conditions for breakeven if tritium was introduced is said to be at extrapolated breakeven.

The current record for highest Q in a tokamak (as recorded during actual D-T fusion) was set by JET at Q = 0.67 in 1997. The record for Q_{ext} (the theoretical Q value of D-T fusion as extrapolated from D-D results) in a tokamak is held by JT-60, with Q_{ext} = 1.25, slightly besting JET's earlier Q_{ext} = 1.14. In December 2022, the National Ignition Facility, or NIF, an inertial confinement facility, reached Q = 1.54 with a 3.15 MJ output from a 2.05 MJ laser heating. NIF achieved ignition seven times. The highest gain as of 2025 of Q = 4.13 yielded 8.6 MJ from 2.08 MJ of laser energy.

== Concept ==
Q (Note: Or very rarely, Q_{fus}.) is the comparison of the power being released by the fusion reactions in a reactor, P_{fus}, to the constant heating power being supplied, P_{heat}, in normal operating conditions. For those designs that do not run in the steady state, but are instead pulsed, the same calculation can be made by summing all of the fusion energy produced in P_{fus} and all of the energy expended producing the pulse in P_{heat}. (Note: In this case, "heat" is somewhat of a misnomer.) However, there are several definitions of breakeven that consider additional power losses.

=== Breakeven ===
In 1955, John Lawson was the first to explore the energy balance mechanisms in detail, initially in classified works but published openly in a now-famous 1957 paper. In this paper he considered and refined work by earlier researchers, notably Hans Thirring, Peter Thonemann, and a review article by Richard Post. Expanding on all of these, Lawson's paper made detailed predictions for the amount of power that would be lost through various mechanisms, and compared that to the energy needed to sustain the reaction. This balance is today known as the Lawson criterion.

In a successful fusion reactor design, the fusion reactions generate an amount of power designated P_{fus}. (Note: This was denoted P_{R} in Lawson's original paper, but changed here to match modern terminology.) Some amount of this energy, P_{loss}, is lost through a variety of mechanisms, mostly convection of the fuel to the walls of the reactor chamber and various forms of radiation that cannot be captured to generate power. In order to keep the reaction going, the system has to provide heating to make up for these losses, where P_{loss} = P_{heat} to maintain thermal equilibrium.

The most basic definition of breakeven is when Q = 1, (Note: In Lawson's original paper, the term Q was used to denote the total energy released by the individual fusion reactions, in MeV, and R referred to the power balance. Later works used Q to refer to the power balance, as it is used in this article.) that is, P_{fus} = P_{heat}.

=== Scientific breakeven ===
Over time, new types of fusion devices were proposed with different operating systems. Magnetic confinement fusion approaches (MCF) are generally designed to operate in the (quasi) steady state. That is, the plasma is maintained in fusion conditions for time scales much longer than the fusion reactions, on the order of seconds or minutes. The goal is to allow most of the fuel time to undergo a fusion reaction. In contrast, inertial confinement fusion (ICF) reactions last only for a time on the order of dozens of fusion reactions, and instead attempt to ensure the conditions are such that much of the fuel will undergo fusion even in this very short time span. To do so, ICF devices compress the fuel to extreme conditions, where the self-heating reactions occur very rapidly.

In an MCF device, the initial plasma is set up and maintained by large magnets, which in modern superconducting devices requires very little energy to run. Once set up, the steady state is maintained by injecting heat into the plasma with a variety of devices. These devices represent the vast majority of the energy needed to keep the system running. They are also relatively efficient, with perhaps as much as half of the electricity fed into them ending up as energy in the plasma. For this reason, P_{heat} in the steady state is something fairly close to all of the energy being fed into the reactor, and the efficiency of the heating systems is generally ignored. When the total efficiency is considered then it is generally not part of the calculation of Q, but instead included in the calculation of engineering breakeven, Q_{eng} (see below).

In contrast, in ICF devices the energy needed to create the required conditions is enormous, and the devices that do so, typically lasers, are extremely inefficient, about 1%. If one used a similar definition of P_{heat}, that is all the energy being fed into the system, then ICF devices are extremely inefficient. For instance, the NIF uses over 400 MJ (0.11 MWh) of electrical energy to produce an output of 3.15 MJ (0.00088 MWh), a ratio of 127 to 1. In contrast to MCF, this energy has to be supplied to spark every reaction, not just get the system up and running.

ICF proponents point out that alternative "drivers" could be used that would improve this ratio at least ten times. If one is attempting to understand improvements in the performance of an ICF system, then it is not the performance of the drivers that is interesting, but the performance of the fusion process itself. Thus, it is typical to define P_{heat} for ICF devices as the amount of driver energy actually hitting the fuel, about 2 MJ (0.56 kWh) in the case of NIF. Using this definition of P_{heat}, one arrives at a Q of 1.5. This is, ultimately, the same definition as the one used in MCF, but the upstream losses are smaller in those systems and no distinction is needed.

To make this distinction clear, modern works often refer to this definition as scientific breakeven, Q_{sci} or sometimes Q_{plasma}, to contrast it with similar terms.

=== Extrapolated breakeven ===
Since the 1950s, most commercial fusion reactor designs have been based on a mix of deuterium and tritium as their primary fuel; other fuels have attractive features but are much harder to ignite. As tritium is radioactive, highly bioactive, and highly mobile, it represents a significant safety concern and adds to the cost of designing and operating such a reactor.

In order to lower costs, many experimental machines are designed to run on test fuels of hydrogen or deuterium alone, leaving out the tritium. In this case, the term extrapolated breakeven, Q_{ext}, is used to define the expected performance of the machine running on D-T fuel based on the performance when running on hydrogen or deuterium alone.

The records for extrapolated breakeven are slightly higher than the records for scientific breakeven. Both JET and JT-60 have reached values around 1.25 (see below for details) while running on D-D fuel. When running on D-T, only possible in JET, the maximum performance is about half the extrapolated value.

=== Engineering breakeven ===
Another related term, engineering breakeven, denoted Q_{E}, Q_{eng} or Q_{total} depending on the source, considers the need to extract the energy from the reactor, turn that into electrical energy, and feed some of that back into the heating system. This closed loop sending electricity from the fusion back into the heating system is known as recirculation. In this case, the basic definition changes by adding additional terms to the P_{fus} side to consider the efficiencies of these processes.

D-T reactions release most of their energy as neutrons and a smaller amount as charged particles like alpha particles. Neutrons are electrically neutral and will travel out of any plasma before they can deposit energy back into it. This means that only the charged particles from the reactions can be captured within the fuel mass and give rise to self-heating. If the fraction of the energy being released in the charged particles is f_{ch}, then the power in these particles is P_{ch} = f_{ch}P_{fus}. If this self-heating process is perfect, that is, all of P_{ch} is captured in the fuel, that means the power available for generating electricity is the power that is not released in that form, or (1 − f_{ch})P_{fus}.

In the case of neutrons carrying most of the practical energy, as is the case in the D-T fuel, this neutron energy is normally captured in a "blanket" of lithium that produces more tritium that is used to fuel the reactor. Due to various exothermic and endothermic reactions, the blanket may have a power gain factor M_{R}. M_{R} is typically on the order of 1.1 to 1.3, meaning it produces a small amount of energy as well. The net result, the total amount of energy released to the environment and thus available for energy production, is referred to as P_{R}, the net power output of the reactor.

The blanket is then cooled and the cooling fluid used in a heat exchanger driving conventional steam turbines and generators. That electricity is then fed back into the heating system. Each of these steps in the generation chain has an efficiency to consider. In the case of the plasma heating systems, $\eta_{heat}$ is on the order of 60 to 70%, while modern generator systems based on the Rankine cycle have $\eta_{elec}$ around 35 to 40%. Combining these we get a net efficiency of the power conversion loop as a whole, $\eta_{NPC}$, of around 0.20 to 0.25. That is, about 20 to 25% of $P_{R}$ can be recirculated.

Thus, the fusion energy gain factor required to reach engineering breakeven is defined as:
$$Q_E \equiv \frac{P_\text{fus}}{P_\text{heat}} = \frac{1}{\eta_\text{heat} \cdot f_\text{recirc} \cdot \eta_\text{elec}\cdot (1-f_\text{ch})}$$

To understand how $Q_E$ is used, consider a reactor operating at 20 MW and Q = 2. Q = 2 at 20 MW implies that P_{heat} is 10 MW. Of that original 20 MW about 20% is alphas, so assuming complete capture, 4 MW of P_{heat} is self-supplied. We need a total of 10 MW of heating and get 4 of that through alphas, so we need another 6 MW of power. Of the original 20 MW of output, 4 MW are left in the fuel, so we have 16 MW of net output. Using M_{R} of 1.15 for the blanket, we get P_{R} about 18.4 MW. Assuming a good $\eta_{NPC}$ of 0.25, that requires 24 MW P_{R}, so a reactor at Q = 2 cannot reach engineering breakeven. At Q = 4 one needs 5 MW of heating, 4 of which come from the fusion, leaving 1 MW of external power required, which can easily be generated by the 18.4 MW net output. Thus for this theoretical design the Q_{E} is between 2 and 4.

Considering real-world losses and efficiencies, Q values between 5 and 8 are typically listed for magnetic confinement devices to reach $Q_E = 1$, while inertial devices have dramatically lower values for $\eta_\text{heat}$ and thus require much higher Q values, on the order of 50 to 100.

=== Ignition ===
As the temperature of the plasma increases, the rate of fusion reactions grows rapidly, and with it, the rate of self-heating. In contrast, non-capturable energy losses like x-rays do not grow at the same rate. Thus, in overall terms, the self-heating process becomes more efficient as the temperature increases, and less energy is needed from external sources to keep it hot.

Eventually P_{heat} reaches zero, that is, all of the energy needed to keep the plasma at the operational temperature is being supplied by self-heating, and the amount of external energy that needs to be added drops to zero. This point is known as ignition. In the case of D-T fuel, where only 20% of the energy is released as alphas that give rise to self-heating, this cannot occur until the plasma is releasing at least five times the power needed to keep it at its working temperature.

Ignition, by definition, corresponds to an infinite Q, but it does not mean that f_{recirc} drops to zero as the other power sinks in the system, like the magnets and cooling systems, still need to be powered. Generally, however, these are much smaller than the energy in the heaters, and require a much smaller f_{recirc}. More importantly, this number is more likely to be near-constant, meaning that further improvements in plasma performance will result in more energy that can be directly used for commercial generation, as opposed to recirculation.

=== Commercial breakeven ===
The final definition of breakeven is commercial breakeven, which occurs when the economic value of any net electricity left over after recirculation is enough to pay for the reactor and all processes to gather and transport reactants, such as tritium and deuterium, to the reactor. This value depends both on the reactor's capital cost and any financing costs related to that, its operating costs including fuel and maintenance, and the spot price of electrical power.

Commercial breakeven relies on factors outside the technology of the reactor itself, and it is possible that even a reactor with a fully ignited plasma operating well beyond engineering breakeven will not generate enough electricity rapidly enough to pay for itself. Whether any of the mainline concepts like ITER can reach this goal is being debated in the field. A large reason for these debates is the current lack of technology and the lack of interest and funding in the area in its current stage. Scientists have only just reached the point in the fusion process where they are having a positive energy gain, meaning the energy produced is marginally more than the energy required to initiate the fusion process. Nuclear physicists are sure that there is a maximum amount of energy that can be harnessed from fusion reactions but the maximum amount is currently unknown. With enough investment, it is possible to increase the Q and create a definite increase in the energy and profits but that doesn’t mean that it is enough to reach the commercial breakeven.

== Practical example ==
Most fusion reactor designs being studied as of 2017 are based on the D-T reaction, as this is by far the easiest to ignite, and is energy-dense. This reaction gives off most of its energy in the form of a single highly energetic neutron, and only 20% of the energy in the form of an alpha. Thus, for the D-T reaction, f_{ch} = 0.2. This means that self-heating does not become equal to the external heating until at least Q = 5.

Efficiency values depend on design details but may be in the range of η_{heat} = 0.7 (70%) and η_{elec} = 0.4 (40%). The purpose of a fusion reactor is to produce power, not to recirculate it, so a practical reactor must have f_{recirc} = 0.2 approximately. Lower would be better but will be hard to achieve. Using these values we find for a practical reactor Q = 22.

== Transient vs. continual ==
Many early fusion devices operated for microseconds, using some sort of pulsed power source to feed their magnetic confinement system while using the compression from the confinement as the heating source. Lawson defined breakeven in this context as the total energy released by the entire reaction cycle compared to the total energy supplied to the machine during the same cycle.

Over time, as performance increased by orders of magnitude, the reaction times have extended from microseconds to seconds, and ITER is designed to have shots that run for several minutes. In this case, the definition of "the entire reaction cycle" becomes blurred. In the case of an ignited plasma, for instance, P_{heat} may be quite high while the system is being set up, and then drop to zero when it is fully developed, so one may be tempted to pick an instant in time when it is operating at its best to determine a high, or infinite, Q. A better solution in these cases is to use the original Lawson definition averaged over the reaction to produce a similar value as the original definition.

There is an additional complication. During the heating phase when the system is being brought up to operational conditions, some of the energy released by the fusion reactions will be used to heat the surrounding fuel, and thus not be released to the environment. This is no longer true when the plasma reaches its operational temperature and enters thermal equilibrium. Thus, if one averages over the entire cycle, this energy will be included as part of the heating term, that is, some of the energy that was captured for heating would otherwise have been released in P_{fus} and is therefore not indicative of an operational Q.

Operators of the JET reactor argued that this input should be removed from the total:
$$Q^* \equiv \frac{P_\text{fus}}{P_\text{heat} - P_\text{temp}}$$
where:
$$P_\text{temp} = \frac{dWp}{dt}$$

That is, P_{temp} is the power applied to raise the internal energy of the plasma. It is this definition that was used when reporting JET's record 0.67 value.

Some debate over this definition continues. In 1998, the operators of the JT-60 claimed to have reached Q = 1.25 running on D-D fuel, thus reaching extrapolated breakeven. This measurement was based on the JET definition of Q*. Using this definition, JET had also reached extrapolated breakeven some time earlier. If one considers the energy balance in these conditions, and the analysis of previous machines, it is argued the original definition should be used, and thus both machines remain well below break-even of any sort.

== Scientific breakeven at NIF ==
Lawrence Livermore National Laboratory (LLNL), the leader in ICF research, uses the modified Q that defines P_{heat} as the energy delivered by the driver to the capsule, as opposed to the energy put into the driver by an external power source. This definition produces much higher Q values, and changes the definition of breakeven to be P_{fus} / P_{laser} = 1. On occasion, they referred to this definition as "scientific breakeven". This term was not universally used; other groups adopted the redefinition of Q but continued to refer to P_{fus} = P_{laser} simply as breakeven.

On 7 October 2013, LLNL announced that roughly one week earlier, on 29 September, it had achieved scientific breakeven in the National Ignition Facility (NIF). In this experiment, P_{fus} was approximately 14 kJ, while the laser output was 1.8 MJ. By their previous definition, this would be a Q of 0.0077. For this press release, they re-defined Q once again, this time equating P_{heat} to be only the amount of energy delivered to "the hottest portion of the fuel", calculating that only 10 kJ of the original laser energy reached the part of the fuel that was undergoing fusion reactions. This release has been heavily criticized in the field.

On 17 August 2021, the NIF announced that in early August 2021, an experiment had achieved a Q value of 0.7, producing 1.35 MJ of energy from a fuel capsule by focusing 1.9 MJ of laser energy on the capsule. The result was an eight-fold increase over any prior energy output.

On 13 December 2022, the United States Department of Energy announced that NIF had exceeded the previously elusive Q ≥ 1 milestone on 5 December 2022. This was achieved by producing 3.15 MJ after delivering 2.05 MJ to the target, for an equivalent Q of 1.54.
