= JT-60 =

Japanese tokamak

Japan Torus-60
- Device type: Tokamak
- Location: Naka, Ibaraki Prefecture, Japan
- Affiliation: Japan Atomic Energy Agency

Technical specifications
- Major radius: 3.4 m (11 ft)
- Minor radius: 1.0 m (3 ft 3 in)
- Plasma volume: 90 m^{3}
- Magnetic field: 4 T (40,000 G) (toroidal)
- Discharge duration: 65 s

History
- Year(s) of operation: 1985–2010
- Preceded by: JFT-2M
- Succeeded by: JT-60SA
- Related devices: TFTR

Links
- Website: www.qst.go.jp/site/jt60-english/

JT-60SA
Japan Torus-60 Super Advanced
- Device type: Tokamak
- Location: Naka, Ibaraki Prefecture, Japan
- Affiliation: QST + F4E

Technical specifications
- Discharge duration: 100 s

History
- Date(s) of construction: 2013–2020
- Year(s) of operation: 2023–present
- Preceded by: JT-60U
- Related devices: ITER

Links
- Website: www.jt60sa.org/wp/

JT-60 (short for Japan Torus-60) is a large research tokamak, the flagship of the Japanese National Institute for Quantum Science and Technology's fusion energy directorate. As of 2023 the device is known as JT-60SA and is the largest operational superconducting tokamak in the world, built and operated jointly by the European Union and Japan in Naka, Ibaraki Prefecture. SA stands for super advanced tokamak, including a D-shaped plasma cross-section, superconducting coils, and active feedback control.

JT-60 claimed that it held the record (Note: Disputed; see below) for the highest value of the fusion triple product achieved: 1.77×10^{28} K·s·m^{−3} = 1.53×10^{21} keV·s·m^{−3}. The product quoted is not a valid fusion triple product since the plasmas did not satisfy the steady state of the Lawson criterion as discussed below.

JT-60 also claimed without proof that it held the record for the hottest ion temperature ever achieved (522 megakelvins). In reality the TFTR machine at Princeton routinely measured higher ion temperatures during the 1993-1996 campaign, as discussed below.

== Original design ==
JT-60 was first designed in the 1970s during a period of increased interest in nuclear fusion from major world powers. The US, UK and Japan were motivated by the excellent performance of the Soviet T-3 tokamak in 1968 to start their own tokamak programs. The Japanese Atomic Energy Research Institute (JAERI), previously dedicated to fission research since 1956, allocated efforts to fusion.

JT-60 began operations on April 8, 1985, and demonstrated performance far below predictions, much like the TFTR and JET that had begun operations shortly prior.

Over the next two decades, TFTR, JET and JT-60 led the effort to regain the performance originally expected of these machines. JT-60 underwent a major modification during this time, JT-60U (for "upgrade") in March 1991. The change resulted in significant improvements in plasma performance.

=== JT-60/TFTR disputed records ===
By 1996, JT-60 had achieved its record ion temperature of 45 keV, which is claimed to have exceeded the highest temperatures measured at that time in the TFTR tokamak in Princeton. Detailed measurements of the ion temperatures analyzed during TFTR's experimental campaign with deuterium-tritium plasmas in 1993–1996, found numerous discharges with temperatures greater than 50 keV in both deuterium-only and deuterium-tritium plasmas. A 2025 publication of a reanalysis of TFTR transport and confinement results for a selected scan of discharges mentions that several "supershots", not in the scan, had ion temperatures of 70 keV with a measurement error bar of 28%.

The TFTR team did not highlight these high temperatures for several reasons. The ion temperature measurements in JT-60, TFTR, and JET measured only singly ionized trace carbon impurity ions, not the temperatures of the hydrogenic ions. The carbon ions do not fuse, and displace the deuterium and tritium ions which can fuse. The hydrogenic ion temperatures can be calculated in the TRANSP analysis code. The methods used are published and widely used in analysis of experimental results. These temperatures are the relevant ones for calculating the deuterium and tritium fusion reactions. They generally are less than the carbon temperatures. Secondly, the end goal of this research, practical minimally polluting fusion energy, does not require ion temperatures greater than about 25 keV. An example of simulation of a burning plasma in ITER is

The fusion triple product metric applies only to plasmas in steady state, as stated explicitly in the Lawson criterion. The JT-60 plasmas with high values were far from steady state; in fact, their conditions rose rapidly in time to those values, and then suffered major disruptions, which extinguished the plasmas abruptly. Examples are in. Also the derivation of the fusion triple product assumes that the fusion power results from thermonuclear fusion (from thermal deuterium and tritium). Instead the high fusion power in past tokamak experiments resulted dominatly from beam-thermal reactions.

Thus the JT-60's claimed record for the triple product is not a 'fusion triple product'. Steady state discharges have been achieved in other devices such as Tore Supra and WEST have announced results for the fusion triple product.

== JT-60U (Upgrade) ==
The main objective of the JT-60U upgrade was to "investigate energy confinement near the breakeven condition, [a] non-inductive current drive and burning plasma physics with deuterium plasmas." To accomplish this, the poloidal field coils and the vacuum vessel were replaced. Construction began in November 1989 and was completed in March 1991. Operations began in July.

JT-60U researchers claimed that on October 31, 1996, they achieved an estimated breakeven factor of Q_{DT}^{eq} = 1.05 at 2.8 MA. In other words, if the homogenous deuterium fuel was theoretically replaced with a 1:1 mix of deuterium and tritium, the fusion reaction is estimated to have created an energy output 1.05 times the energy injected into the tokamak. An estimate based on a discharge in 1968 gave Q_{DT}^{eq} = 1.25. The record of the central ratio Q_{core} achieved in a tokamak discharge is 1.3 in JET in 1998.

A credible estimate of extrapolation of a deuterium plasma to a deuterium-tritium plasma requires starting with a validated and verified integrated computer model, and then reruning with a deuterium-tritium mixture to calculate the fusion yield. Details of the deuterium plasma also need to be shown for credibility. An example of such an estimate was published before TFTR started its deuterium-tritium campaign in 1993–1996. This paper calculated that the Q_{DT}^{eq} would be 0.32. In retrospect, the record achieved was 0.28 (discharge 80539) so the projection were optimistic. A much larger amount of energy was injected into the TFTR and JT-60U test chambers. JT-60U was not equipped to utilize tritium, as it would add extensive costs and safety risks. (Note: The JT-60 team submitted data for more than ten of its best discharges to the PPPL Princeton Plasma Physics Laboratory for analysis with its TRANSP code for analysis and extrapolation to a hypothetical mix of deuterium and tritium fuel. The results are archived at PPPL. The submitted data were not sufficient for credible modeling since they lacked data for the profile of the impurities, which would dilute the deuterium and tritium. The TRANSP modeling over estimated the measured fusion rate by a wide margin. Also the data set did not include a sufficient number of time steps needed for accuracy.)

In February 1997, a modification to the divertor from an open-type shape to a semi-closed W-shape for greater particle and impurity control was started and later completed in May. Experiments simulating the helium exhaust in ITER were promptly performed with the modified divertor, with great success. In 1998, the modification allowed JT-60U to reach an estimated fusion energy gain factor of Q_{DT}^{eq} = 1.25 at 2.6 MA, as discussed above.

In December 1998, a modification to the vacuum pumping system that began in 1994 was completed. In particular, twelve turbomolecular pumps with oil bearings and four oil sealed rotary vacuum pumps were replaced with magnetically suspended turbomolecular pumps and dry vacuum pumps. The modification reduced the 15-year-old system's consumption of liquid nitrogen by two thirds.

In fiscal year 2003, the plasma discharge duration of JT-60U was successfully extended from 15 s to 65 s.

In 2005, ferritic steel (ferromagnet) tiles were installed in the vacuum vessel to correct the magnetic field structure and hence reduce the loss of fast ions. The JAEA used new parts in the JT-60, having improved its capability to hold the plasma in its powerful toroidal magnetic field.

Sometime in 2007–2008, in order to control plasma pressure at the pedestal region and to evaluate the effect of fuel on the self-organization structure of plasma, a supersonic molecular beam injection (SMBI) system was installed in JT-60U. The system's design was a collaboration between Cadarache, CEA, and JAEA. Q_{DT}^{eq} JT-60U ended operations on August 29, 2008.

== JT-60SA ==
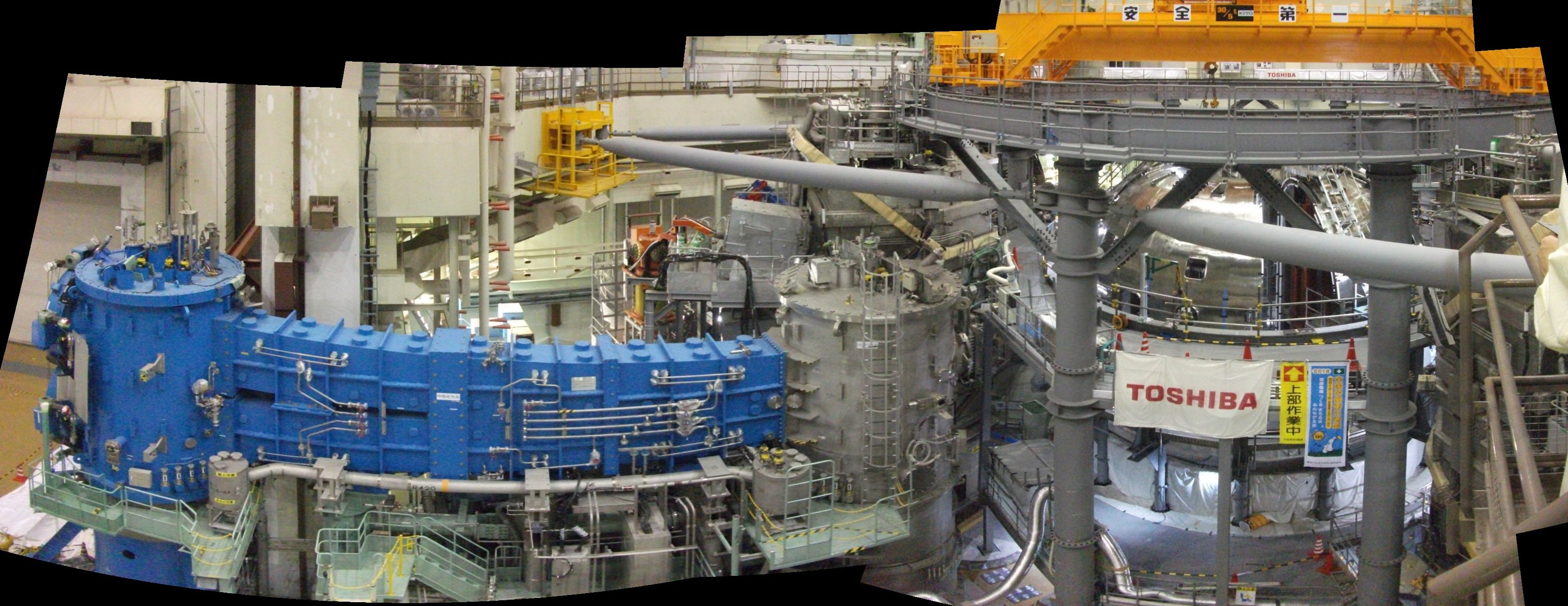
JT-60SA under construction in 2016.

JT-60SA is the successor to JT-60U, operating as a satellite to ITER as described by the Broader Approach Agreement. It is a fully superconducting tokamak with flexible components that can be adjusted to find optimized plasma configurations and address key physics issues. Assembly began in January 2013 and was completed in March 2020. After a major short circuit during integrated commissioning in March 2021 necessitating lengthy repairs, it was declared active on December 1, 2023. The overall cost of its construction is estimated to be around €560000000, adjusted for inflation.

Weighing roughly 2,600 short tons (2,400 t), JT-60SA's superconducting magnet system includes 18 D-shaped niobium-titanium toroidal field coils, a niobium-tin central solenoid, and 12 equilibrium field coils.

=== History ===
The idea of an advanced tokamak, a tokamak utilizing superconducting coils, traces back to the early 1960s. The idea seemed very promising, but was not without its problems. Around January 1972, engineers at JAERI initiated an effort to further research the idea and try to solve its hurdles. This initiative progressed in parallel with the development of JT-60, and by 1983-84 it was decided that it constituted its own experimental reactor: FER (Fusion Experimental Reactor).

However, the JT-60U upgrade in 1991 demonstrated the significant flexibility of the JT-60 facilities and assembly site, so by January 1993 FER was designated as a modification to JT-60U and renamed JT-60SU (for Super Upgrade).

In January 1996, a paper detailing the superconducting properties of Nb_{3}Al composite wire and its fabrication process was published in the 16th International Cryogenic Engineering/Materials Conference journal. Engineers assessed the potential use of the aluminide in JT-60SU's 18 toroidal coils.

Designs and intentions for the modification varied over the next decade, until February 2007, when the Broader Approach Agreement was signed between Japan and the European Atomic Energy Community. In it, the Satellite Tokamak Program established a clear, defined goal for JT-60SA: act as a small-scale ITER. This way, JT-60SA could give hindsight to engineers assembling and operating the full-scale reactor in the future.

It was planned for JT-60 to be disassembled and then upgraded to JT-60SA by adding niobium-titanium superconducting coils by 2010. It was intended for the JT60SA to be able to run with the same shape plasma as ITER. The central solenoid was designed to use niobium-tin (because of the higher (9 T) field).

=== Assembly ===
Construction of the tokamak officially began on 28 January 2013 with the assembly of the cryostat base, which was shipped from Avilés, Spain over a 75-day-long journey. (Note: The ship IYO (IMO number: 9300879) routed through the Panama Canal) The event was highly publicized through local and national news, and reporters from 10 media organizations were able to witness it in person.

Assembly of the vacuum vessel began in May 2014. The vacuum vessel was manufactured as ten sectors with varying arcs (20°×1, 30°×2, 40°×7) that had to be installed sequentially. On June 4, 2014, two of ten sectors were installed. In November 2014 seven sectors had been installed. In January 2015 nine sectors had been installed.

Construction was to continue until 2020 with first plasma planned in September 2020. Assembly was completed on March 30, 2020, and in March 2021 it reached its full design toroidal field successfully, with a current of 25.7 kA.

=== Short circuit ===
On March 9, 2021, a coil energization test was being performed on equilibrium field coil no. 1 (EF1) when the coil current rapidly increased, then suddenly flatlined. The reactor was safely shut down over the next few minutes, during which the pressure in the cryostat increased from 10×10^{−3} Pa to 7000 Pa. Investigations immediately followed.

The incident, which came to be known as the "EF1 feeder incident", was found to be caused by a major short circuit resulting from insufficient insulation of the quench detection wire conductor exit. The formed arc damaged the shells of EF1, causing a helium leak to the cryostat.

In total, 90 locations required repairs and machine sensors needed to be rewired. However, the intricate JT-60SA was designed and assembled with intense precision, meaning access to the machine was sometimes limited. Risks of further delay to plasma operations compounded the issue.

The JT-60SA team was disappointed with the incident, given how close the machine was to operation, but persevered. The Satellite Tokamak Programme Project Committee (STP-PC) reacted by dedicating a meeting to the incident in May same year in which event timelines and root causes were discussed and shared with european teams. The incident was expected to push back the program schedule by 15 months.

Repairs were completed in May 2023 and preparations for operation began.

=== Present operations ===
JT-60SA achieved first plasma on October 23, 2023, making it the largest operational superconducting tokamak in the world as of 2026. The reactor was declared active on December 1, 2023.

== Specifications ==
(60 stands for JT-60, 60U stands for JT-60U, 60SA stands for JT-60SA) ("60SA I" refers to the initial/integrated research phase of JT-60SA, "60SA II" refers to the extended research phase)

Plasma
	Volume	Current	Major radius	Minor radius	Aspect ratio	Height	Pulse length	Elongation	Triangularity
60		2.1 MA - 2.6 MA	3 m	0.85 m - 0.95 m	3.52 - 3.15		5 s		
60U	90 m^{3}	3 MA	3.4 m	1 m	3.4	1.5±0.3 m	65 s	1.5±0.3	
60SA I		5.5 MA	2.97 m	1.17 m	2.54	2.14 m	100 s	1.83	0.50
60SA II		5.5 MA	2.97 m	1.18 m	2.52	2.28 m	100 s	1.93	0.57

Vacuum Vessel
	Material	Baking temp.	One-turn resistance
60	Inconel 625	500 °C	> 1.3 mΩ
60U	Inconel 625	300 °C	0.2 mΩ
60SA	SS 316L	200 °C	16 µΩ

Toroidal Field Coils
	#	Turns	Material	Coil current	Inductance	Resistance	Time constant
60	18	1296		52.1 kA	2.1 H	84 mΩ	25 s
60U	18	1296	AgOFCu	52.1 kA	2.1 H	97 mΩ	21.65 s
60SA							
