= Lawson–Woodward theorem =

Physics theorem

The Lawson–Woodward theorem is a physics theorem about particle acceleration with electromagnetic wave. It was developed by scientists John D. Lawson and P. M. Woodward in the 1940s. This theorem roughly states that an electromagnetic plane wave can not provide a net acceleration to an ultra-relativistic charged particle in vacuum. This is a theoretical limitation to particle acceleration, especially for laser-based electron accelerator. Any laser-based particle accelerator should then break at least one of the hypotheses of the Lawson–Woodward theorem to be physically possible.
