= John D. Lawson (scientist) =

British engineer and physicist (1923–2008)

John David Lawson FRS (4 April 1923 – 15 January 2008) was a British engineer and physicist specialized in plasma, particle accelerators and nuclear physics. The Lawson criterion for nuclear fusion and the Lawson–Woodward theorem for particle accelerators is named after him.

== Early life ==
He was born in Coventry and educated at Wolverhampton Grammar School before going on to St John's College, Cambridge, to study for the short (two year) Mechanical Sciences degree, including a special wartime radio course. He graduated BA in 1943 and then joined the Telecommunications Research Establishment, Malvern, where he was assigned to work on microwave antenna design as part of the ongoing work on development of radar.

== Career ==
At the end of the war, Lawson continued to work at Malvern, although in 1947 he was made a member of the staff of the Atomic Energy Research Establishment (AERE). He undertook experimental work with the new 30 MeV synchrotron.

In 1951, he was transferred to the General Physics Division of the AERE at Harwell. Lawson started to work on the klystron, a device for producing high-power microwaves, in a group led by Peter Thonemann who was also in charge of the ZETA (Zero Energy Toroidal Assembly) fusion work. It was through Lawson's association with Thonemann that he became interested in the topic of nuclear fusion.

He is known for his 1955 paper, published in 1957, where he presented for the first time to the public his famous Lawson criterion to optimize nuclear fusion.

Lawson also worked with the 175 MeV cyclotron and on early accelerator proposals. He remained on the staff of the AERE to 1961, spending 1959-1960 as Research Associate at the W. W. Hansen Laboratories at Stanford where his work included the study of the properties of caesium plasma.

In 1961, Lawson was transferred to the newly established National Institute for Research in Nuclear Science, placed very close to Harwell village, an institution shortly to become the Rutherford Appleton Laboratory. He continued his work on accelerators and led the project to build the Variable Energy Cyclotron (for AERE Harwell). He had responsibility for building up the superconducting magnet programme and retained an interest in new accelerator concepts. In the 1970s he moved onto the study of very high current beams. In 1975-1976 Lawson returned to fusion research with a two-year sabbatical at the Culham Laboratory, working on a design study of a conceptual fusion power reactor based on the reversed field pinch principle.

He returned to the Rutherford Appleton Laboratory in 1977 where he continued working on free electron lasers and accelerator design, and also played a leading international role in promoting and critically examining ideas for future accelerators. In the early 1980s, he recognized the potential that high-power lasers could have for particle acceleration, and set up a small research group in lasers base on the concept of plasma acceleration. He retired in 1987.

== Death ==
Lawson died on 15 January 2008.

== Books ==
In 1977, he published his book The Physics of Charged Particle Beams was published (second edition 1989), which became a classic textbook on particle accelerators.

== Honors and awards ==
Lawson was awarded the University of Cambridge Sc.D. in Physics in 1959 and made a Fellow of the Institute of Physics in 1970. In 1983 he was elected a Fellow of Royal Society for his contributions to the field of applied electromagnetism, in particular the physics of charged particle beams and high temperature plasmas.

== See also ==
- History of Fusion - Papers on the early days of controlled thermonuclear fusion research in the UK, 1945-60, collected by Dr J .D. Lawson
- The Papers of John David Lawson held at Churchill Archives Centre
