= National Institute of Radiological Sciences =

Research institute in Japan

Coordinates: 35.6356°N 140.1017°E

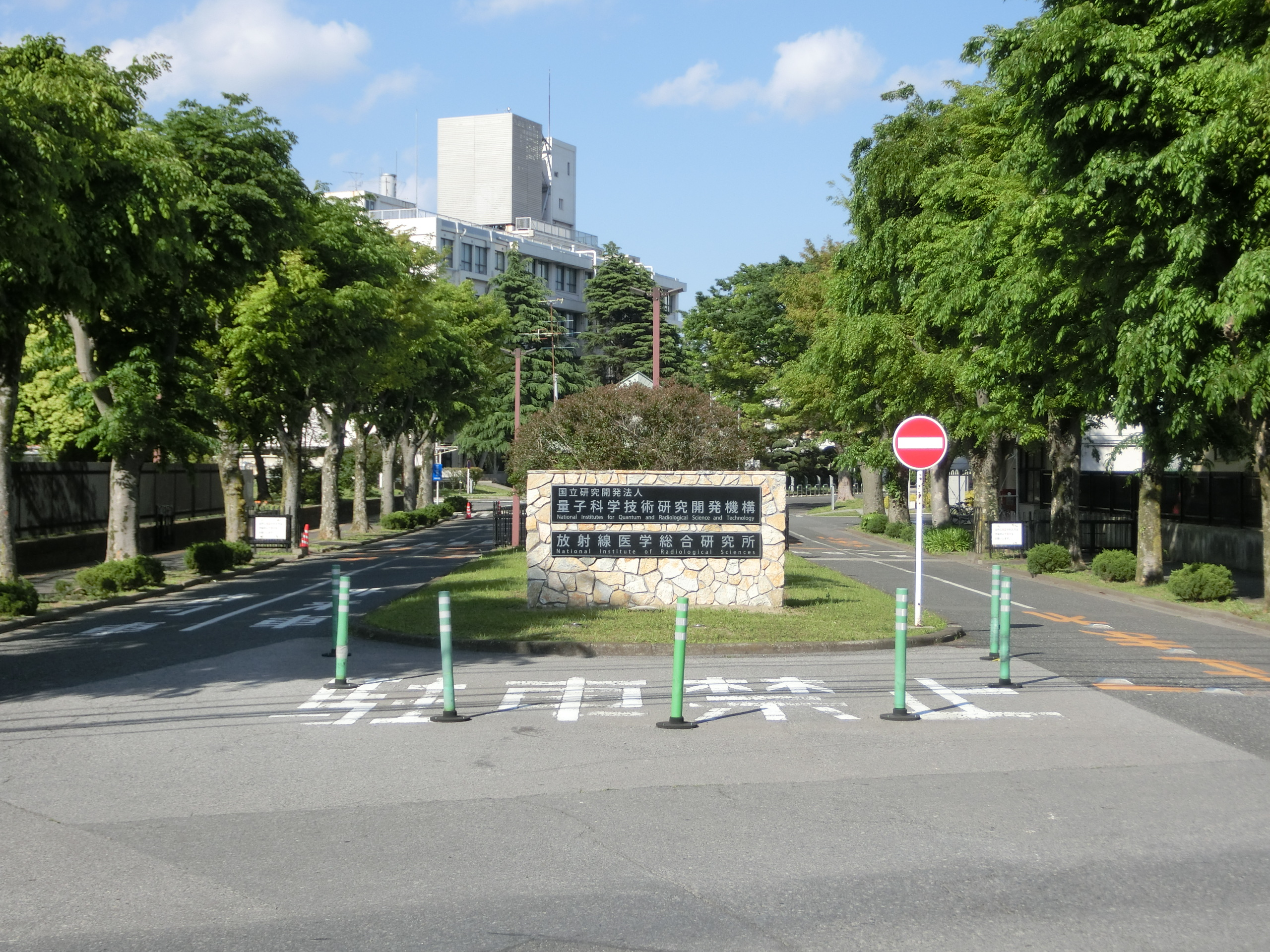
- Main gate
- Established: 1957
- President: Yoshiharu Yonekura, M.D., Ph.D.
- Staff: 800 (As of 2012)
- Address: 4-9-1 Anagawa, Inage-ku, Chiba-shi, Chiba 263-8555, Japan
- Location: Chiba, Japan
- Website: Official website

The National Institute of Radiological Sciences (放射線医学総合研究所) (NIRS) is a radiation research institute in Japan. The NIRS was established in 1957 as Japan's only institute of radiology. The NIRS maintains various ion accelerators in order to study the effects of radiation of the human body and medical uses of radiation.

== History ==
The National Institute of Radiological Sciences hospital was established in 1961 as a research hospital with a basic focus on radiation therapy.

In 1993, the HIMAC (Heavy Ion Medical Accelerator in Chiba) of NIRS was launched, and in 1997, the Research Center for Charged Particle Therapy was opened as one of the leading medical centers using carbon ions are in operation.

On April 1, 2016, the Japan Atomic Energy Agency (JAEA) transferred some of its laboratories to the NIRS, and the NIRS body was renamed to the National Institutes for Quantum and Radiological Science and Technology (QST), which includes existing laboratories of the NIRS; the NIRS is currently a radiological research division of the QST.

== Organizational structure ==
- Auditing and Compliance Office (Headquarters)
- Department of Planning and Management
- Department of General Affairs
- Research, Development and Support Center
- Research Center for Charged Particle Therapy
- Hospital (QST [Quantum and Radiological Science and Technology] Hospital; formerly NIRS Hospital)
- Molecular Imaging Center
- Research Center for Radiation Protection
- Research Center for Radiation Emergency Medicine
- Radiation Emergency Medical Assistance Team
- Center for Human Resources Development
- International Open Laboratory
- Medical Exposure Research Project
- Fukushima Project Headquarters
