= TRANSP =

Computer code for analyzing tokamak plasma experiments

TRANSP is a computational tool developed at the Princeton Plasma Physics Laboratory (PPPL) for the interpretive and predictive modeling of plasma behavior in magnetic confinement fusion experiments. The goal of this research is to develop clean, abundant, and sustainable energy to mitigate rapid climate change, enhance energy security, and provide long-term solutions to global energy needs. TRANSP has been primarily used to analyze data from tokamak experiments and it also can be applied to other magnetic confinement devices. TRANSP supports studies related to plasma transport, fast ion dynamics, heating, particle fueling, and momentum transport. The web site for TRANSP is https://transp.pppl.gov

TRANSP uses Fortran, C/C++, Java, Python, Perl, Bash, and C shell scripts. It supports OpenMP, Open MPI, and Open ACC. TRANSP is stored on GitHub. TRANSP implements Monte Carlo methods with MPI to calculate with message passing interface (MPI) processing.

TRANSP contains a powerful Monte Carlo method module, NUBEAM for computing kinetic properties of fast ions, such as neutral beam injected ions and fusion alpha particles. The computed properties include the distributions fast ions energy in space, energy, and the ratio of parallel to the plasma current velocity to perpendicular to the plasma current. It incorporates an electromagnetic wave solver for computing effects of Ion cyclotron resonance heating and current drive of the plasma ions and electrons.

TRANSP development started in the late 1970s. It was first used to model plasmas from experiments in the Tokamak Fusion Test Reactor (TFTR) at PPPL. As of 2025, the program has been continuously and extensively developed and maintained at PPPL, with ongoing contributions documented in recent updates and publications. It supports 55 tokamak configurations, performing around 10,000 simulations per year to support current and future fusion energy experiments.

TRANSP plays important roles in studies, and is used in many publications related to theory and experiments conducted in tokamaks such as Joint European Torus in the UK; ASDEX Upgrade and TEXTOR Forschungszentrum Jülich in Germany; KSTAR in Korea, EAST Experimental Advanced Superconducting Tokamak and HL-2M in China; Tore Supra WEST (formerly Tore Supra) in France; and in DIII-D DIII-D (tokamak) and NSTX-U National Spherical Torus Experiment in the US.

TRANSP was employed in predictive modeling studies, such as those related to expected fusion reaction rates in TFTR's deuterium-tritium campaigns. An early example is a prediction of fusion reaction rates expected from later experiments in TFTR using deuterium and tritium. TRANSP was the first integrated computer program used for studying phenomena within the plasma boundary of tokamak discharges. It is used to compute properties which cannot be measured directly, such as the radial transport of plasma species, energy, toroidal momentum, and angular momentum. It computes the effects of actuators used to heat and fuel the plasma. The program generates parameters that can be compared with real measurements to verify the accuracy and credibility of the digital model.

== Applications in Fusion Research ==
TRANSP was used to accurately model a precursor TFTR experiment with deuterium plasma, and then was further used to substitute a mix of deuterium and tritium into the model. The predicted fusion gain, (Q_{DT}), defined as the ratio of fusion energy produced to the external heating power applied to the plasma, was 0.32. Later, deuterium-tritium experiments in 1993–1996 achieved a maximum Q_{DT} of 0.28 indicating that there were foreseen processes besides the straight forward mix of tritium with deuterium.

TRANSP with NUBEAM have been used to provide data for theoretical studies and to benchmark other fast-ion codes. One example of the benchmarking the particle following Monte Carlo code ASCOT and other neutral beam modeling codes.

Publications using TRANSP for JET results include a summary of analysis of modeling of deuterium-tritium experiments in JET and calculations of the fusion gain ratio in the plasma core and simulation of multiple fast ion species studies of optimizing non-thermal fusion power. and

Publications of results from experiments in NSTX-U National Spherical Torus Experiment also rely on TRANSP-generated results. Studies of ways to create reverse magnetic shear are in TRANSP is being used in studies of fast ion transport and Alfvén wave interactions.

TRANSP is being used to predict results from future experiments in ITER. Many examples are discussed in. An early example supports the prediction of achieving Q_{DT} in the range 5–14, and a study predicted Q_{DT} values in the range 5–14, based on TRANSP modeling under specific assumptions. Other examples include and which projected fusion gains of 3.5-7 in a steady-state mode and 5.6-8.3 in a hybrid mode, depending on the assumptions used for transport and source modeling.

Another use of TRANSP is for predicting ITER discharges in the early, non-activation phase. Ion and electron density and temperatures are predicted.
