= Lawson criterion =

Criterion for igniting a nuclear fusion chain reaction

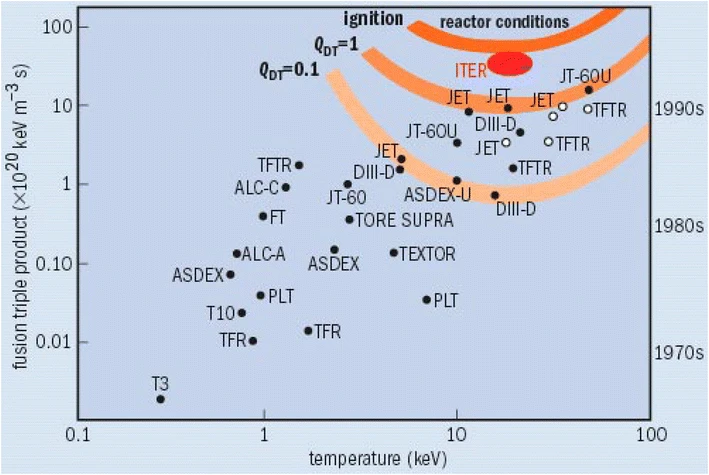
Lawson criterion of important magnetic confinement fusion experiments

The Lawson criterion is a figure of merit used in nuclear fusion research. It compares the rate of energy being generated by fusion reactions within the fusion fuel to the rate of energy losses to the environment. When the rate of production is higher than the rate of loss, the system will produce net energy. If enough of that energy is captured by the fuel, the system will become self-sustaining and is said to be ignited.

The concept was first developed by John D. Lawson in a classified 1955 paper that was declassified and published in 1957. As originally formulated, the Lawson criterion gives a minimum required value for the product of the plasma (electron) density n_{e} and the "energy confinement time" $\tau_E$ that leads to net energy output.

Later analysis suggested that a more useful figure of merit is the triple product of density, confinement time, and plasma temperature T. The triple product also has a minimum required value, and the name "Lawson criterion" may refer to this value.

On August 8, 2021, researchers at Lawrence Livermore National Laboratory's National Ignition Facility in California confirmed to have produced the first-ever successful ignition of a controlled nuclear fusion reaction surpassing the Lawson's criteria in the experiment.

== Energy balance ==
The central concept of the Lawson criterion is an examination of the energy balance for any fusion power plant using a hot plasma. This is shown below:

Net power = Efficiency × (Fusion − Radiation loss − Conduction loss)

1. Net power is the excess power beyond that needed internally for the process to proceed in any fusion power plant.
2. Efficiency is how much energy is needed to drive the device and how well it collects energy from the reactions.
3. Fusion is rate of energy generated by the fusion reactions.
4. Radiation loss is the energy lost as light (including X-rays) leaving the plasma.
5. Conduction loss is the energy lost as particles leave the plasma, carrying away energy.

Lawson calculated the fusion rate by assuming that the fusion reactor contains a hot plasma cloud which has a Gaussian curve of individual particle energies, a Maxwell–Boltzmann distribution characterized by the plasma's temperature. Based on that assumption, he estimated the first term, the fusion energy being produced, using the volumetric fusion equation.

Fusion = Number density of fuel A × Number density of fuel B × Cross section(Temperature) × Energy per reaction

1. Fusion is the rate of fusion energy produced by the plasma
2. Number density is the density in particles per unit volume of the respective fuels (or just one fuel, in some cases)
3. Cross section is a measure of the probability of a fusion event, which is based on the plasma temperature
4. Energy per reaction is the energy released in each fusion reaction

This equation is typically averaged over a population of ions which has a normal distribution. The result is the amount of energy being created by the plasma at any instant in time.

Lawson then estimated the radiation losses using the following equation:

$$P_B = 1.4 \times 10^{-34} \cdot n^2 \cdot T^{1/2} \; \frac{\mathrm{W}}{\mathrm{cm}^3}$$

where n is the number density of the cloud and T is the temperature. For his analysis, Lawson ignores conduction losses. In reality this is nearly impossible; practically all systems lose energy through particle transport, where mass leaves the plasma and carries away its energy.

By equating radiation losses and the volumetric fusion rates, Lawson estimated the minimum temperature for the fusion for the deuterium–tritium (D-T) reaction

$$^2_1\mathrm{D} +\, ^3_1\mathrm{T}  \rightarrow\, ^4_2\mathrm{He} \left(3.5\, \mathrm{MeV}\right)+\, ^1_0\mathrm{n}  \left(14.1\, \mathrm{MeV}\right)$$

to be 30 million degrees (2.6 keV), and for the deuterium–deuterium (D-D) reaction

$$^2_1\mathrm{D} +\, ^2_1\mathrm{D}  \rightarrow\, ^3_1\mathrm{T} \left(1.0\, \mathrm{MeV}\right)+\, ^1_1\mathrm{p}  \left(3.0\, \mathrm{MeV}\right)$$

to be 150 million degrees (12.9 keV).

== Extensions into nτ_{E} ==
The confinement time $\tau_E$ measures the rate at which a system loses energy to its environment. The faster the rate of loss of energy, $P_{\mathrm{loss}}$, the shorter the energy confinement time. It is the energy density $W$ (energy content per unit volume) divided by the power loss density $P_{\mathrm{loss}}$ (rate of energy loss per unit volume):

$$\tau_E = \frac{W}{P_{\mathrm{loss}}}$$

For a fusion reactor to operate in steady state, the fusion plasma must be maintained at a constant temperature. Thermal energy must therefore be added at the same rate the plasma loses energy in order to maintain the fusion conditions. This energy can be supplied by the fusion reactions themselves, depending on the reaction type, or by supplying additional heating through a variety of methods.

For illustration, the Lawson criterion for the D-T reaction will be derived here, but the same principle can be applied to other fusion fuels. It will also be assumed that all species have the same temperature, that there are no ions present other than fuel ions (no impurities and no helium ash), and that D and T are present in the optimal 50-50 mixture.^{a} Ion density then equals electron density and the energy density of both electrons and ions together is given, according to the ideal gas law, by

$$W = 3nT$$

where $T$ is the temperature in electronvolt (eV) and $n$ is the particle density.

The volume rate $f$ (reactions per volume per time) of fusion reactions is

$$f = n_{\mathrm{d}} n_{\mathrm{t}} \langle \sigma v \rangle = \frac{1}{4}n^2 \langle \sigma v\rangle$$

where $\sigma$ is the fusion cross section, $v$ is the relative velocity, and $\langle \rangle$ denotes an average over the Maxwellian velocity distribution at the temperature $T$.

The volume rate of heating by fusion is $f$ times $E_{\mathrm{ch}}$, the energy of the charged fusion products (the neutrons cannot help to heat the plasma). In the case of the D-T reaction, $E_{\mathrm{ch}} = 3.5\,\mathrm{MeV}$.

The Lawson criterion, or minimum value of (electron density * energy confinement time) required for self-heating, for three fusion reactions. For DT, nτ_{E} minimizes near the temperature 25 keV (300 million kelvins).

The Lawson criterion requires that fusion heating exceeds the losses:

$$f E_{\rm ch} \ge P_{\rm loss}$$

Substituting in known quantities yields:

$$\frac{1}{4}n^2 \langle\sigma v\rangle E_{\rm ch} \ge \frac{3nT}{\tau_E}$$

Rearranging the equation produces:

$n\tau_{\rm E} \ge L \equiv \frac{12T}{E_{\rm ch}\langle\sigma v\rangle}$	1

The quantity $T/\langle\sigma v\rangle$ is a function of temperature with an absolute minimum. Replacing the function with its minimum value provides an absolute lower limit for the product $n\tau_E$. This is the Lawson criterion.

For the deuterium–tritium reaction, the physical value is at least

$$n \tau_E \ge 1.5 \cdot 10^{20} \frac{\mathrm{s}}{\mathrm{m}^3}$$

The minimum of the product occurs near $T = 26\,\mathrm{keV}$.

== Extension into the "triple product" ==
A still more useful figure of merit is the "triple product" of density, temperature, and confinement time, nTτ_{E}. For most confinement concepts, whether inertial, mirror, or toroidal confinement, the density and temperature can be varied over a fairly wide range, but the maximum attainable pressure p is a constant. When such is the case, the fusion power density is proportional to p^{2}<σv>/T^{2}. The maximum fusion power available from a given machine is therefore reached at the temperature T where <σv>/T^{2} is a maximum. By continuation of the above derivation, the following inequality is readily obtained:

$$n T \tau_{\rm E} \ge \frac{12}{E_{\rm ch}}\,\frac{T^2}{\langle\sigma v\rangle}$$

The fusion triple product condition for three fusion reactions

The quantity $\frac{T^2}{\langle\sigma v\rangle}$ is also a function of temperature with an absolute minimum at a slightly lower temperature than $\frac{T}{\langle\sigma v\rangle}$.

For the D-T reaction, the minimum occurs at T = 14 keV. The average <σv> in this temperature region can be approximated as

$$\left \langle \sigma v \right \rangle = 1.1 \cdot 10^{-24} T^2 \; \frac{{\rm m}^3}{\rm s} \, {\rm ,} \quad {\rm T \, in \, keV} {\rm ,}$$

so the minimum value of the triple product value at T = 14 keV is about

$$\begin{matrix}
n T \tau_E & \ge & \frac{12\cdot 14^2 \cdot {\rm keV}^2}{1.1\cdot 10^{-24} \frac{{\rm m}^3}{\rm s} 14^2 \cdot 3500 \cdot{\rm keV}} \approx 3 \cdot 10^{21} \mbox{keV s}/\mbox{m}^3 \\
\end{matrix}
(3.5 \cdot 10^{28} \mbox{K s}/\mbox{m}^3)$$

This number has not yet been achieved in any reactor, although the latest generations of machines have come close. JT-60 reported 1.53×10^{21} keV.s.m^{−3}. For instance, the TFTR has achieved the densities and energy lifetimes needed to achieve Lawson at the temperatures it can create, but it cannot create those temperatures at the same time. ITER aims to do both.

As for tokamaks, there is a special motivation for using the triple product. Empirically, the energy confinement time τ_{E} is found to be nearly proportional to n^{1/3}/P^{2/3}. In an ignited plasma near the optimum temperature, the heating power P equals fusion power and therefore is proportional to n^{2}T^{2}. The triple product scales as

$$\begin{matrix}n T \tau_E & \propto & n T \left(n^{1/3}/P^{2/3}\right) \\
& \propto & n T \left(n^{1/3}/\left(n^2 T^2\right)^{2/3}\right) \\
& \propto & T^{-1/3} \\
\end{matrix}$$

The triple product is only weakly dependent on temperature as T^{-1/3}. This makes the triple product an adequate measure of the efficiency of the confinement scheme.

== Inertial confinement ==
The Lawson criterion applies to inertial confinement fusion (ICF) as well as to magnetic confinement fusion (MCF) but in the inertial case it is more usefully expressed in a different form. A good approximation for the inertial confinement time $\tau_E$ is the time that it takes an ion to travel over a distance R at its thermal speed

$$v_{th} = \sqrt{\frac{k_{\rm B} T}{m_i}}$$

where m_{i} denotes mean ionic mass. The inertial confinement time $\tau_E$ can thus be approximated as

$$\begin{matrix}
\tau_E & \approx & \frac{R}{v_{th}} \\
\\
& = & \frac{R}{\sqrt{\frac{k_{\rm B} T}{m_i}}} \\
\\
& = & R \cdot \sqrt{\frac{m_i}{k_{\rm B} T}} \mbox{ .} \\
\end{matrix}$$

By substitution of the above expression into relationship (1), we obtain

$$\begin{matrix}
n \tau_E & \approx &  n \cdot R \cdot \sqrt{\frac{m_i}{k_B T}} \geq \frac{12}{E_{\rm ch}}\,\frac{k_{\rm B}T}{\langle\sigma v\rangle} \\
\\
n \cdot R & \gtrapprox & \frac{12}{E_{\rm ch}}\,\frac{\left(k_{\rm B}T\right)^{3/2}}{\langle\sigma v\rangle\cdot m_i^{1/2}}\\
\\
n \cdot R & \gtrapprox & \frac{\left(k_{\rm B}T\right)^{3/2}}{\langle\sigma v\rangle}\mbox{ .} \\
\end{matrix}$$

This product must be greater than a value related to the minimum of T^{3/2}/<σv>. The same requirement is traditionally expressed in terms of mass density ρ = <nm_{i}>:

$$\rho \cdot R \geq 1 \mathrm{g}/\mathrm{cm}^2$$

Satisfaction of this criterion at the density of solid D-T (0.2 g/cm^{3}) would require a laser pulse of implausibly large energy. Assuming the energy required scales with the mass of the fusion plasma (E_{laser} ~ ρR^{3} ~ ρ^{−2}), compressing the fuel to 10^{3} or 10^{4} times solid density would reduce the energy required by a factor of 10^{6} or 10^{8}, bringing it into a realistic range. With a compression by 10^{3}, the compressed density will be 200 g/cm^{3}, and the compressed radius can be as small as 0.05 mm. The radius of the fuel before compression would be 0.5 mm. The initial pellet will be perhaps twice as large since most of the mass will be ablated during the compression.

The fusion power times density is a good figure of merit to determine the optimum temperature for magnetic confinement, but for inertial confinement the fractional burn-up of the fuel is probably more useful. The burn-up should be proportional to the specific reaction rate (n^{2}<σv>) times the confinement time (which scales as T^{-1/2}) divided by the particle density n:

$$\begin{matrix}
\mbox{burn-up fraction } & \propto & n^2\langle\sigma v\rangle T^{-1/2}/n \\
& \propto &  \left( n T\right)\langle\sigma v\rangle /T^{3/2}\\
\end{matrix}$$

Thus the optimum temperature for inertial confinement fusion maximises <σv>/T^{3/2}, which is slightly higher than the optimum temperature for magnetic confinement.

== Non-thermal systems ==
Lawson's analysis is based on the rate of fusion and loss of energy in a thermalized plasma. There is a class of fusion machines that do not use thermalized plasmas but instead directly accelerate individual ions to the required energies. The best-known examples are the migma, fusor and polywell.

When applied to the fusor, Lawson's analysis is used as an argument that conduction and radiation losses are the key impediments to reaching net power. Fusors use a voltage drop to accelerate and collide ions, resulting in fusion. The voltage drop is generated by wire cages, and these cages conduct away particles.

Polywells are improvements on this design, designed to reduce conduction losses by removing the wire cages which cause them. Regardless, it is argued that radiation is still a major impediment.

== See also ==
- Fusion energy gain factor (Q)

== Notes ==
^a It is straightforward to relax these assumptions. The most difficult question is how to define $n$ when the ion and electrons differ in density and temperature. Considering that this is a calculation of energy production and loss by ions, and that any plasma confinement concept must contain the pressure forces of the plasma, it seems appropriate to define the effective (electron) density $n$ through the (total) pressure $p$ as $n = p/2 T_{\mathrm{i}}$. The factor of $2$ is included because $n$ usually refers to the density of the electrons alone, but $p$ here refers to the total pressure. Given two species with ion densities $n_{1,2}$, atomic numbers $Z_{1,2}$, ion temperature $T_{\mathrm{i}}$, and electron temperature $T_{\mathrm{e}}$, it is easy to show that the fusion power is maximized by a fuel mix given by $n_{1}/n_{2} = (1 + Z_{2}T_{\mathrm{e}}/T_{\mathrm{i}})/(1 + Z_{1}T_{\mathrm{e}}/T_{\mathrm{i}})$. The values for $n\tau$, $nT\tau$, and the power density must be multiplied by the factor $(1 + Z_{1}T_{\mathrm{e}}/T_{\mathrm{i}}) \cdot (1 + Z_{2}T_{\mathrm{e}}/T_{\mathrm{i}})/4$. For example, with protons and boron ($Z = 5$) as fuel, another factor of $3$ must be included in the formulas. On the other hand, for cold electrons, the formulas must all be divided by $4$ (with no additional factor for $Z > 1$).
