= Ohmic plasma =

An ohmic plasma is a plasma that is maintained and/or replenished by the heat produced when a plasma current flows through its resistance, as occurs in the induced poloidal magnetic field of a tokamak. Efficiency decreases as the plasma temperature increases. The mechanism is similar to the heat created with an electric current flowing through a resistance (ohmic).

== Related terms and topics ==
- Spitzer resistivity
- Alfvén wave
- Tokamak
