= Aeroflot Flight 415 =

1962 aviation accident

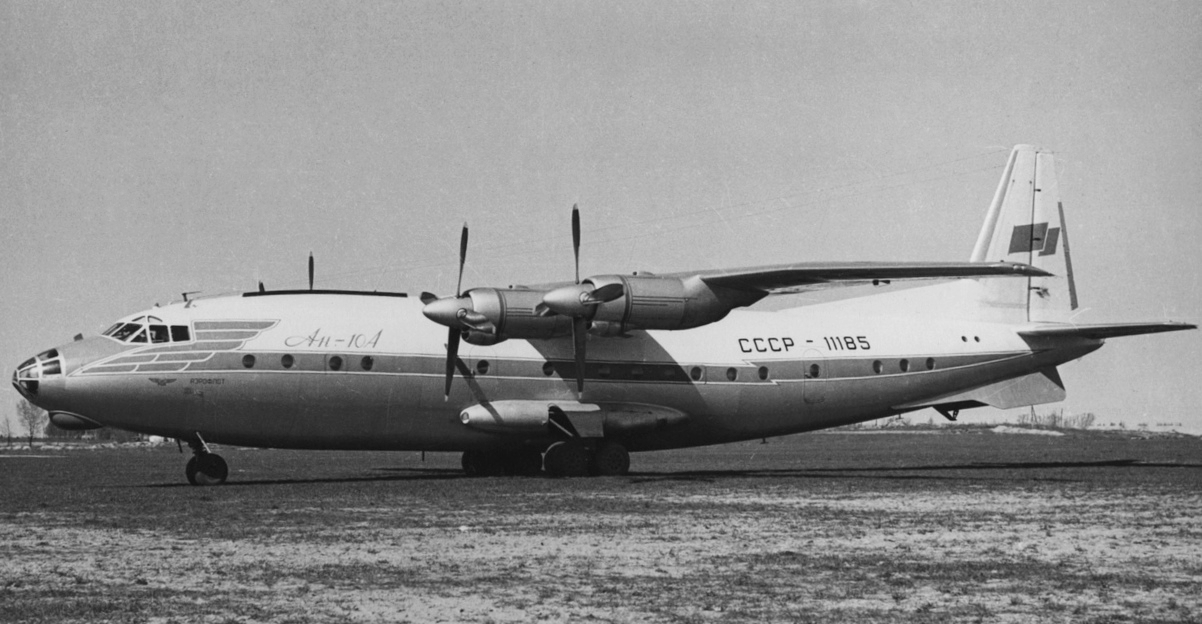
- An Antonov An-10, similar to the one involved in the accident

Accident
- Date: 28 July 1962
- Summary: CFIT due to ATC error
- Site: 21 km southeast of Sochi Airport

Aircraft
- Aircraft type: Antonov An-10A
- Operator: Aeroflot
- Registration: CCCP-11186
- Flight origin: Snilow Airport
- Stopover: Simferopol Airport
- Destination: Adler/Sochi Airport
- Occupants: 81
- Passengers: 74
- Crew: 7
- Fatalities: 81
- Survivors: 0

Aeroflot Flight 415 (Russian: Рейс 415 Аэрофлота Reys 415 Aeroflota) was a domestic scheduled passenger flight operated by Aeroflot from Lviv to Sochi with a stopover in Simferopol. On 28 July 1962 the Antonov An-10 operating the route crashed near Gagra, Abkhaz ASSR, Georgian SSR, killing all 81 passengers and crew on board.

== Aircraft ==
The aircraft involved in the accident was an Antonov An-10A with four Ivchenko AI-20K engines, registered CCCP-11186 to the Ukraine division of Aeroflot. At the time of the accident, the aircraft had sustained 1,358 flight hours and 1,059 pressurization cycles.

== Passengers and crew ==
74 passengers and seven crew members were aboard Flight 415. The cockpit crew consisted of the following:

- Captain Boris Martyashev
- Copilot Vladimir Sergeev
- Navigator Grigory Karavay
- Flight Engineer Vasily Kozyrev
- Radio Operator Peter Shmygal

Nuclear physicist Natan Yavlinsky, designer of tokamak devices, was on the flight with his family.

== Description of accident ==
At 14:37 the An-10 departed from Simferopol Airport and proceeded on the route at an altitude of 6000 meters. At 15:06 the flight was passed over to Sochi air traffic control. At 15:29 the crew of the An-10 contacted air traffic control and were instructed to proceed on a bearing of 240° and given information regarding the weather; mild winds at 3–4 m/s were present. The controller failed to inform the flight crew about the cloudcover at approximately 600 meters on the mountains nearby. Shortly thereafter the aircraft was given permission to decrease altitude to 500 meters. At 15:37 the crew reported they were at the new assigned altitude and still on a bearing of 240°; to which the controller responded with by ordering the flight to change course to a bearing of 60°; after which the air traffic controller was replaced when shifts were changed. When the air traffic controller noticed the aircraft approaching the mountains, he ordered the flight to change course to the left by 20°, when in fact it would have taken a minimum of 60° to avoid the mountains. At 15:41 and at an altitude of 500 meters, the aircraft crashed into the 700-meter-tall (2,300 ft) mountain, killing all 81 people aboard the plane.

== Causes ==
Numerous errors were responsible for the crash, including but not limited to:

- The unsatisfactory flight plan, which established the flight approaching the airport at a bearing of 240° from the side of the mountains;
- The approach configuration itself, which was not approved by the Ministry of Civil Aviation
- Insufficient preparation for the flight to Sochi Airport by the crew, resulting in their following the air traffic controller’s instructions which put them on a dangerous course, causing the flight to enter the clouds and crash into the mountain.
- The vicinity of the approach of aircraft to the mountains, specifically the distance of separation between incoming flights and the mountains.

== Aftermath ==
After the crash the approach by the mountains was banned. All incoming aircraft to Sochi Airport now carry out approach over the sea.
