= Natan Yavlinsky =

Soviet physicist (1912–1962)

- Натан Аронович Явлинский
- Born: 13 February 1912; Kharkov, Russian Empire
- Died: 28 July 1962 (aged 50); Gagra, Georgian SSR, Soviet Union
- Citizenship: Soviet
- Education: Kharkiv Polytechnic Institute
- Known for: Soviet nuclear program; Tokamak; Stellarator
- Awards: Order of the Red Banner of Labour; Order of the Red Star; Medal "For the Defence of Stalingrad" (1942); Medal "For the Victory over Germany in the Great Patriotic War 1941–1945" (1945); Medal "For Valiant Labor in the Great Patriotic War of 1941–1945" (1945); Stalin Prize (1949 1958); Lenin Prize (1958)
- Scientific career
- Fields: Physics
- Workplaces: Kurchatov Institute; USSR Academy of Science; Moscow Power Engineering Institute

Natan Aronovich Yavlinsky (Russian: Натан Аронович Явлинский; 13 February 1912 – 28 July 1962) was a physicist in the former Soviet Union who invented and developed the first working tokamak.

== Early life and career ==
Yavlinsky was born to a Jewish family of doctors on 13 February 1912 at Kharkov, Russian Empire. Grigory Yavlinsky, an economist and politician, is related to him. He underwent professional technical school (PTU) in 1931 and finished an engineering degree in 1936 at Kharkiv Polytechnic Institute (then Kharkiv V.I. Lenin Polytechnic Institute). As a student, he worked in the Kharkiv Electromechanical Plant. He became a member of the Communist Party of the Soviet Union (then All-Union Communist Party) in 1932, but was removed from the party in 1937. His exclusion from the party also cost him his work at the Moscow Power Engineering Institute (founded as Correspondence Power Engineering Institute). While little is known about his removal from the party, his membership and his position was restored in 1939. He would continue working in the institute until 1948, when he would obtain his Candidate of Sciences, the Soviet equivalent of a Doctor of Philosophy degree. Also by 1948, Yavlinsky became a senior associate of the USSR Academy of Science.

== Second World War ==
While Yavlinsky was exempted from rendering military service for his scientific background and as head of the factory design bureau in the Moscow Power Engineering Institute, he still volunteered when the Second World War opened in the Soviet Union in 1941 as head of the Soviet artillery repair workshop. His service during the Battle of Stalingrad earned him the Medal "For the Defence of Stalingrad" in 1942. Also for his military service, he later received the Medal "For the Victory over Germany in the Great Patriotic War 1941–1945" and the Medal "For Valiant Labor in the Great Patriotic War of 1941-1945". Two years after, in 1944, he was recalled from the front to develop electric motor systems for artillery in the institute. For this work, he was awarded the Stalin Prize in 1949.

== Contribution to nuclear physics ==
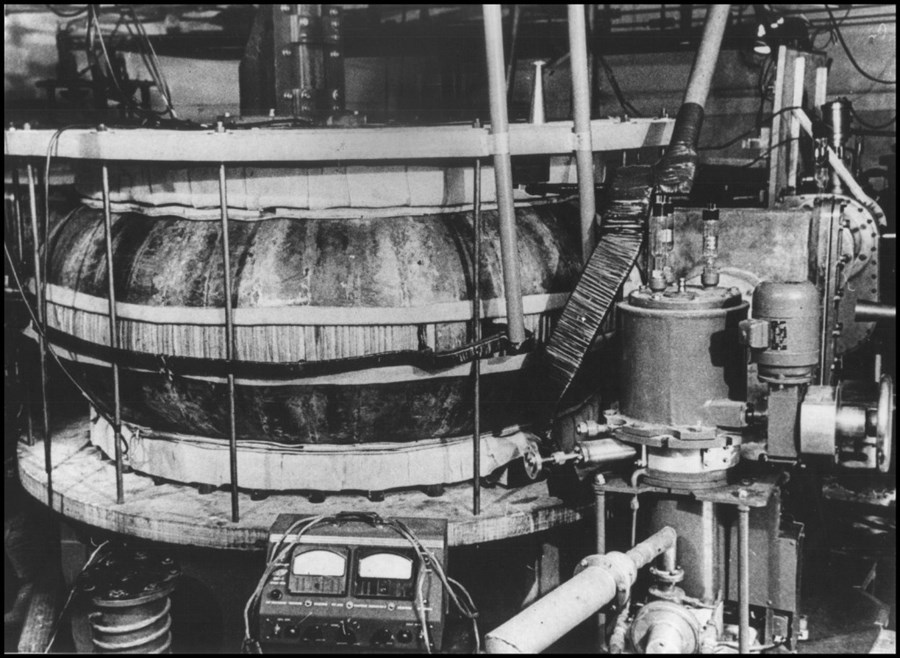
The world's first tokamak device is the T-1 Tokamak at the Kurchatov Institute in Moscow.

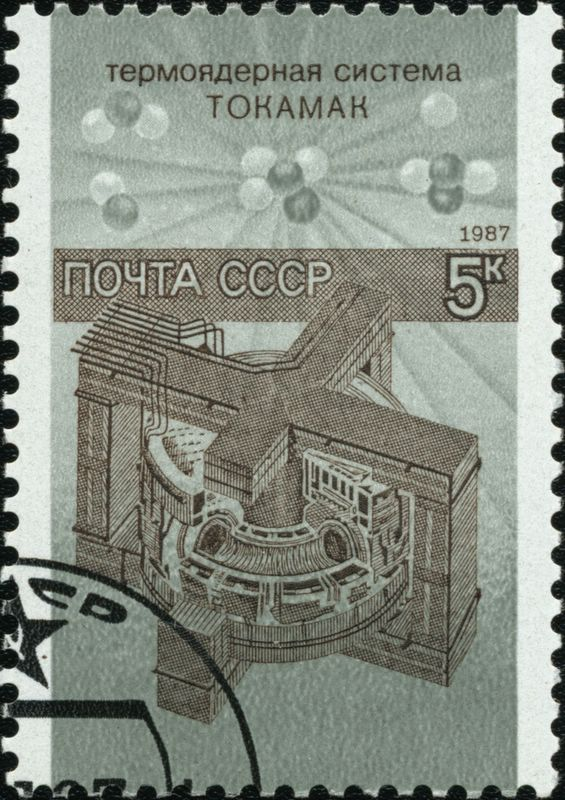
The tokamak on a 1987 USSR stamp.

The first attempts to build a practical fusion machine took place in the United Kingdom, where George Paget Thomson had selected the pinch effect as a promising technique in 1945. After several failed attempts to gain funding, he gave up and asked two graduate students, Stanley (Stan) W. Cousins and Alan Alfred Ware (1924-2010), to build a device out of surplus radar equipment. This was successfully operated in 1948, but showed no clear evidence of fusion and failed to gain the interest of the Atomic Energy Research Establishment. In 1948, Yavlinsky moved to the Kurchatov Institute (also known as the I. V. Kurchatov Institute of Atomic Energy, named after its head Igor Kurchatov). By this time, other Soviet scientists under Kurchatov such as Nobel Prize laureates Andrei Sakharov and Igor Tamm were working on the Soviet atomic bomb project. As for Yavlinsky, who was given his own laboratory in the institute, he was tasked to develop power supply systems. It did not take long before he also became involved in nuclear research.

After developing the bomb, Sakharov and Tamm began work on the tokamak system in 1951. A tokamak (Russian: Токамáк) is a device that uses a powerful magnetic field to confine a hot plasma in the shape of a torus. The tokamak is one of several types of magnetic confinement devices being developed to produce controlled thermonuclear fusion power. The word tokamak is a transliteration of the Russian word токамак, an acronym of either:

- "тороидальная камера с магнитными катушками" (toroidal'naya kamera s magnitnymi katushkami) — toroidal chamber with magnetic coils; or
- "тороидальная камера с аксиальным магнитным полем" (toroidal'naya kamera s aksial'nym magnitnym polem) — toroidal chamber with axial magnetic field.

The term was attributed to Igor Golovin. Sakharov and Tamm completed a much more detailed consideration of their original proposal, calling for a device with a major radius (of the torus as a whole) of 12 metres (39 ft) and a minor radius (the interior of the cylinder) of 2 metres (6 ft 7 in). The proposal suggested the system could produce 100 grams (3.5 oz) of tritium a day, or breed 10 kilograms (22 lb) of U233 a day. However, Yavlinsky and another scientist, Golovin, considered developing another model focusing on more static toroidal arrangement. It was the development of the concept now known as the safety factor (labelled q in mathematical notation) that guided tokamak development; by arranging the reactor so this critical factor q was always greater than 1, the tokamaks strongly suppressed the instabilities that plagued earlier designs. Yavlinsky's model led to the creation of T-1, the first real tokamak, in 1958. The T-1 used both stronger external magnets and a reduced current compared to stabilized pinch machines like ZETA. Yavlinsky was already preparing the design of an even larger model, later built as T-3, the first large tokamak. With the apparently successful ZETA announcement, Yavlinsky's engineering concept became viewed as more acceptable. For his work on "powerful impulse discharges in a gas, to obtain unusually high temperatures needed for thermonuclear processes," he was awarded the Lenin Prize and the Stalin Prize in 1958. Despite this success, Kurchatov asked Yavlinsky to develop a stellarator instead of finishing the T-3. Besides, as of 1961, the succeeding installation known as the T-2 began showing issues in the toroidal circuits. Nevertheless, Yavlinsky's design prevailed as other Soviet scientists began to favor the tokamak and persuaded Kurchatov to leave the stellarator research to the Americans.

== Death ==
Yavlinsky was not to see the T-3 completed. On 28 July 1962, while travelling from Lviv to Sochi through Aeroflot Flight 415, he and his family died in an airplane crash at Gagra. While there has been speculation that his death was connected with politics, primarily over his intended developments in nuclear research, the government did not provide any clear indication that this was so. Despite his death, the T-3 was finished, and began to show successful results in compensating the inadequacies of other systems, including the stellarator, by 1965. The T-3 had then surpassed the Bohm limit ten times. Three years later, when the Soviets had achieved two main criteria in achieving nuclear fusion, namely the temperature level and the plasma confinement time, the so-called tokamak stampede had reached the United States.
