= Robert W. Bussard =

American physicist

Robert W. Bussard (August 11, 1928 – October 6, 2007) was an American physicist who worked primarily in nuclear fusion energy research. He was the recipient of the Schreiber–Spence Space Achievement Award for STAIF-2004. He was also a fellow of the International Academy of Astronautics and held a Ph.D. from Princeton University.

== Kiwi (Rover-A) ==
In June 1955 Bussard moved to Los Alamos and joined the Nuclear Propulsion Division's Project Rover designing nuclear thermal rocket engines. Bussard and R.D. DeLauer wrote two important monographs on nuclear propulsion, Nuclear Rocket Propulsion and Fundamentals of Nuclear Flight.

== Bussard ramjet ==
In 1960, Bussard conceived of the Bussard ramjet, an interstellar space drive powered by hydrogen fusion using hydrogen collected with a magnetic field from the interstellar gas. Due to the presence of high-energy particles throughout space, much of the interstellar hydrogen exists in an ionized state (H II regions) that can be manipulated by magnetic or electric fields. Bussard proposed to "scoop" up ionized hydrogen and funnel it into a fusion reactor, using the exhaust from the reactor as a rocket engine.

It appears the energy gain in the reactor must be extremely high for the ramjet to work at all; any hydrogen picked up by the scoop must be sped up to the same speed as the ship in order to provide thrust, and the energy required to do so increases with the ship's speed. Hydrogen itself does not fuse very well (unlike deuterium, which is rare in the interstellar medium), and so cannot be used directly to produce energy, a fact which accounts for the billion-year scale of stellar lifetimes. This problem was solved, in principle, according to Bussard, by use of the stellar CNO cycle, in which carbon is used as a catalyst to burn hydrogen via the strong nuclear reaction.

=== In science fiction ===
Bussard Ramjets are common plot devices in science fiction.

Larry Niven uses them in his Known Space setting to propel interstellar flight. Following a standard hi-tech faster/cheaper/better learning curve, he started with robot probes during the early stages of interstellar colonization and eventually plotted them as affordable to wealthy individuals relocating their families off a too-crowded Earth (in "The Ethics of Madness"). Niven also employed Bussard ramjets as the propulsion and stabilizing engines of the Ringworld (four novels), which were also set in Known Space.

In the Star Trek universe, a variation called the Bussard Hydrogen Collector or Bussard Ramscoop appears as part of the matter–antimatter propulsion system that allows Starfleet ships to travel faster than the speed of light. The ramscoops attach to the front of the warp nacelles, and when the ship's internal supply of deuterium runs low, they collect interstellar hydrogen and convert it to deuterium and anti-deuterium for use as the primary fuel in a starship's warp drive.

== Atomic Energy Commission ==
In the early 1970s Bussard became Assistant Director under Director Robert Hirsch at the Controlled Thermonuclear Reaction Division of what was then known as the Atomic Energy Commission. They founded the mainline fusion program for the United States based on the tokamak. Bussard left the AEC in 1973, after the funding of the Symmetrical Tokamak and Princeton Large Torus at PPPL.

In June 1995, Bussard claimed in a letter to all fusion laboratories, as well as to key members of the US Congress, that he and the other founders of the program supported the tokamak not out of conviction that it was the best technical approach but rather as a vehicle for generating political support, thereby allowing them to pursue "all the hopeful new things the mainline labs would not try".

== Independent fusion ventures ==
=== Riggatron and INESCO ===
In 1977 he founded the private company INESCO, International Nuclear Energy Systems Company, with Bruno Coppi to promote the riggatron nuclear fusion concept. It was among the earliest private fusion companies. It did not ultimately get enough funding to build a riggatron.

=== Polywell fusor ===
Bussard worked on a promising new type of inertial electrostatic confinement (IEC) fusor, the polywell, that has a magnetically shielded grid (MaGrid). He founded Energy/Matter Conversion Corporation, Inc. (EMC2) in 1985 to validate his theory, and tested several (15) experimental devices from 1994 through 2006. The U.S. Navy contract funding that supported the work expired while experiments were still small. However, the final tests of the last device, WB-6, reputedly solved the last remaining physics problem just as the funding expired and the EMC2 labs had to be shut down.

Further funding was eventually found, the work continued and the WB-7 prototype was constructed and tested, and the research is ongoing.

=== Funding Polywell ===
During 2006 and 2007, Bussard sought the large-scale funding necessary to design and construct a full-scale Polywell fusion power plant. His fusor design is feasible enough, he asserted, to render unnecessary the construction of larger and larger test models still too small to achieve break-even. Also, the scaling of power with size goes as the seventh power of the machine radius, while the gain scales as the fifth power, so there is little incentive to build half-scale systems; one might as well build the real thing.

On March 29, 2006, Bussard claimed on the fusor.net internet forum that EMC² had developed an inertial electrostatic confinement fusion process that was 100,000 times more efficient than previous designs, but that the US Navy budget line item that supported the work was zero-funded in FY2006.

Bussard provided more details of his breakthrough and the circumstances surrounding the end of his Navy funding in a letter to the James Randi Educational Foundation internet forum on June 23.

From October 2, 2006, to October 6, 2006, Bussard presented an informal overview of the previous decade of his work at the 57th International Astronautical Congress. This was the first publication of this work in 11 years, as the U.S. Navy had put an embargo on publications of the research, in 1994.

Bussard presented further details of his IEC fusion research at a Google Tech Talk on November 9, 2006, of which a video was widely circulated.

Bussard presented more of his thoughts on the potential world impact of fusion power at a Yahoo! Tech Talk on April 10, 2007. (The video is only available internally for Yahoo employees.) He also spoke on the internet talk radio show The Space Show, Broadcast 709, on May 7, 2007.

He founded a non-profit organization to solicit tax-deductible donations to restart the work in 2007, EMC2 Fusion Development Corporation.

=== Spaceflight ===
In a 1998 Analog magazine article, fellow fusion researcher Tom Ligon described an easily built demonstration fusor system along with some of Bussard's ideas for fusion reactors and incredibly powerful spacecraft propulsion systems, with which spacecraft could swiftly move throughout the solar system.

== Quotes ==
"Thus, we have the ability to do away with oil (and other fossil fuels) but it will take 4–6 years and ca. $100–200M to build the full-scale plant and demonstrate it."

"Somebody will build it; and when it's built, it will work; and when it works people will begin to use it, and it will begin to displace all other forms of energy."

== Death ==
Bussard died from multiple myeloma on October 6, 2007, at age 79.

== See also ==
- Tokamak
- Bussard ramjet
- Polywell
- Farnsworth Fusor
- IEC
- Project Rover
- Nuclear propulsion
