= PRAGYA tokamak =

Tiny Indian tokamak

PRAGYA
PRAGYA Tokamak
- Device type: Low aspect ratio compact tokamak
- Location: Bangalore, Karnataka, India
- Affiliation: Pranos Fusion Energy; Jawaharlal Nehru Centre for Advanced Scientific Research

Technical specifications
- Major radius: 0.40 m
- Minor radius: 0.18 m
- Magnetic field: 0.1 Tesla
- Plasma current: 25 kA

PRAGYA is a tokamak in India. It is India's first privately developed low aspect ratio tokamak device designed by the Pranos Fusion Energy. It is a tiny tokamak device having a radius of just 0.4 m. Pranos describes it as a precursor to a larger device.

== History ==
In the 2026, the Bangalore based startup company Pranos Fusion, started working on nuclear fusion.

The startup company Pranos Fusion was founded by Dr Shaurya Kaushal, an Indian physicist. The other co-founder of the company is Roshan George.

The funding for PRAGYA came from the institutional investor Industrial47.

The company initially developed a software to design an optimal tokamak. After that, in June 2025, the company started building PRAGYA as a testbed reactor. In March 2026, Pranos researchers published a paper that "detailed the design and mechanical analysis of the PRAGYA's vacuum vessel". Pranos said that it took approximately eight months to build PRAGYA. It was constructed by a team of 12 members. The team includes physicists, engineers and computational scientists working at the Innovation and Development Centre of the Jawaharlal Nehru Centre for Advanced Scientific Research (JNCASR).

== Uses and working ==
PRAGYA is designed to serve as an experimental platform for studying and controlling fusion plasmas.

It is not intended to generate commercial fusion power but to act as a testing ground for technologies needed to build future fusion reactors in the country. The company plans to operate PRAGYA for nearly two decades. It aims to conduct about 10 to 12 experiments per day.

According to the physicists and the experts, the continuous experiments will provide a large amount of data, which will be useful in further improving fusion reactor technology in the future.

== Objectives and researches ==
The primary objective of PRAGYA is to study plasma physics for building a commercial fusion reactor in India. It was built with the aim to first understand methods for controlling plasma, focusing on tokamak design, plasma control systems, and plasma testing techniques.

Another objective is to do research on high-temperature superconducting magnets. These magnets are useful for controlling plasmas in fusion machines.

== Components ==
PRAGYA contains several components. The major components are plasma control, high-temperature superconducting magnets, and plasma diagnostics.
