= Riggatron =

Fusion reactor design

A Riggatron is a magnetic confinement fusion reactor design created by Robert W. Bussard in the late 1970s. It is a tokamak on the basis of its magnetic geometry, but some unconventional engineering choices were made. In particular, Riggatron used copper magnets positioned inside the lithium blanket, which was hoped to lead to much lower construction costs. Originally referred to as the Demountable Tokamak Fusion Core (DTFC), the name was later changed to refer to the Riggs Bank, which funded development along with Bob Guccione, publisher of the adult magazine Penthouse. It was developed by INESCO, International Nuclear Energy Systems Company, among the earliest private fusion companies.

== Conventional tokamak design ==
In a conventional tokamak design the confinement magnets are arranged outside a "blanket" of liquid lithium. The lithium serves two purposes, one is to absorb the neutrons from the fusion reactions and produce tritium which is then used to fuel the reactor, and as a secondary role, as shielding to prevent those neutrons from reaching the magnets. Without the lithium blanket the neutrons degrade the magnets quite quickly.

This arrangement has two disadvantages. One is that a magnetic field must be produced not only in the plasma, where it is needed, but also in the blanket, where it is not, significantly raising the construction costs. The other is that the core, where the magnetic coils penetrate the machine along its axis, must be large enough to contain the shielding, which limits the achievable aspect ratio. A higher aspect ratio generally results in better performance.

== Riggatron improvement ==
The Riggatron re-arranged the layout of the conventional design, reducing the role of the lithium to producing tritium only. The magnets were to be directly exposed on the inside of the reactor core, bearing the full neutron flux. This precluded the use of superconducting magnets, and even copper magnets would have to be disposed in as little as 30 days of operation. The Riggatron was laid out to make this core replacement as easy and fast as possible. After removal and replacement, the magnets would then be melted down and reprocessed. Although this process would be costly, the smaller magnetized volume (major radius only 0.9 m), the larger aspect ratio, and the reduction in complexity by avoiding superconducting magnets was a tradeoff that would, it was hoped, pay off.

Another advantage of the parameters chosen was that ignition appeared to be possible with ohmic heating alone, as opposed to more expensive systems like ion injection normally required. The first proposal, made in the late 1970s, projected that the device would be able to produce about three or four times the power in fusion reactions as it used in powering the heaters and magnets. This represents a fusion energy gain factor (or simply "fusion gain" or Q) of three or four. The project was never completed as Guccioni was unable to secure the $150 million needed to build the full-sized device (much of which would have been for a large homopolar generator).

== Fusion research establishment consideration ==
Studies carried out at the time suggest the Riggatron was not considered as much of a "sure thing" by other members of the fusion research establishment. Existing experimental tokamaks generally do not include a lithium blanket, and are thus fairly similar to the Riggatron in layout, yet none of these reactors is close to generating a fusion gain of one, let alone the three that was being claimed for the Riggatron. In retrospect it appears the Riggatron concept likely would not have worked, due to the various plasma instabilities that were only being discovered coincident with its design process. Interest in the Riggatron has essentially disappeared.

With the demise of the original project, Bussard moved on to new inertial electrostatic confinement fusion designs with extremely high claimed performance. This culminated in his final development of IEC before his death in October 2007 - the Polywell device.
