= Igor Golovin =

Soviet and Russian Nuclear Physicist

Igor Nikolaevich Golovin
- Игорь Николаевич Головин
- Born: 12 March 1913; Moscow
- Died: 15 April 1997 (aged 84); Moscow
- Resting place: Vvedenskoye Cemetery
- Education: Moscow State University
- Known for: Tokamak
- Awards: Order of Lenin Order of the October Revolution; Order of the Badge of Honour; Medal "For Labour Valour"; Stalin Prize; Lenin Prize Honoured Scientist of the RSFSR
- Scientific career
- Fields: Physics
- Workplaces: Moscow Aviation Institute Kharkiv Institute of Physics and Technology National Research Centre Kurchatov Institute
- Thesis: Polarization of vacuum in Dirac's theory (1939)
- Doctoral advisor: Igor Tamm

Igor Nikolaevich Golovin (Russian: Игорь Николаевич Головин; 12 March 1913 – 15 April 1997) was a Russian physicist whose career was spent on the former Soviet program of nuclear weapons and nuclear fusion. He is known for coining the term Tokamak.

== Biography ==
Igor Golovin was born in Moscow on 12 March 1913 to Nikolai Alexandrovich Golovin and Maria Salvadorovna. His father was a professor of geodesy at Moscow Land Survey.

Igor entered Moscow State University Faculty of Physics in 1931 and completed his graduation in 1936. In 1939, he received his doctoral degree in physics and mathematical sciences under Igor Tamm. He then went to work at Moscow Aviation Institute where he taught physics till 1943. In July 1941, when Nazi Germany invaded Soviet Union, Igor went to fight at the front line. After fighting for some time, he was dismissed by the medical commission due to bad health and returned to Moscow Aviation Institute. In June 1942, Moscow Aviation Institute was evacuated to Alma-Ata due to Moscow being under the threat of advancing German forces. In Alma-Ata, he worked with A. K. Walter and K. D. Sinelnikov on the development of microwave technology for radar at the Ukrainian Physics and Technology Institute. In 1943, he returned to Moscow

In 1944, he joined Laboratory No. 2 of the USSR Academy of Sciences (today - the Kurchatov Institute) and together with L. A. Artsimovich, worked on the development of the electromagnetic method of isotope separation. In 1950, he was appointed as first deputy to I. V. Kurchatov, the position he held until 1958. After 1950, he worked on controlled thermonuclear fusion. Under his leadership, research was carried out on the stabilisation of pinches using a longitudinal magnetic field. Thus in 1955, the first toroidal device for plasma confinement and the predecessor of the tokamak, TMP. was created. It was later in 1957 that he introduced the term "tokamak", an acronym of "toroidal chamber with magnetic coils".

In 1957) he was appointed as the chief of the OGRA (Russian Огра - trap, or containment) department at the institute, a position he held until 1974. Under his leadership, a sequence of experimental installations named OGRA–1 through OGRA–4 were established. In 1962, Golovin and his team experimentally discovered the stabilizing effect of differential plasma rotation at OGRA–1 facility. In 1971, world's first fusion trap using superconducting coils was experimentally demonstrated at OGRA–3 facility. At the end of his scientific career, he was engaged in the ideas of few–neutron fusion and the use of Helium-3 isotope.

He died on 15 April 1997 and was buried at Vvedenskoye Cemetery, Moscow.
