= Spitzer resistivity =

Electrical resistivity of a plasma

The Spitzer resistivity (or plasma resistivity), also called 'Spitzer-Harm resistivity', is an expression describing the electrical resistance in a plasma, which was first formulated by Lyman Spitzer in 1950. The Spitzer resistivity of a plasma decreases in proportion to the electron temperature as $T_\text{e}^{{-3/2}}$.

The inverse of the Spitzer resistivity $\eta_{\rm Sp}$ is known as the Spitzer conductivity $\sigma_{\rm Sp}=1/\eta_{\rm Sp}$.

== Formulation ==
The Spitzer resistivity is a classical model of electrical resistivity based upon electron-ion collisions and it is commonly used in plasma physics. The Spitzer resistivity (in units of ohm-meter) is given by:

$$\eta_{\rm Sp} = \frac{4\sqrt{2\pi}}{3}\frac{Ze^{2}m_\text{e}^{1/2}\ln \Lambda}{\left(4\pi\varepsilon_0\right)^2 \left(k_\text{B}T_\text{e}\right)^{3/2}} ,$$

where $Z$ is the ionization of nuclei, $e$ is the electron charge, $m_\text{e}$ is the electron mass, $\ln\Lambda$ is the Coulomb logarithm, $\varepsilon_0$ is the electric permittivity of free space, $k_\text{B}$ is the Boltzmann constant, and $T_\text{e}$ is the electron temperature (in Kelvin).

One way to convert the $\eta_{\rm Sp}$ of a plasma column to its resistance is to multiply by the length of the column and divide by its area.

In CGS units, the expression is given by:

$\eta_{\rm Sp} = \frac{4\sqrt{2\pi}}{3}\frac{Ze^{2}m_\text{e}^{1/2}\ln \Lambda}{\left(k_\text{B}T_\text{e}\right)^{3/2}}.$ |^{[need to indicate how to put the result in 1/Ohm-cm or Siemens/m ]}

This formulation assumes a Maxwellian distribution, and the prediction is more accurately determined by

$$\eta_{\rm Sp}^\prime = \eta_{\rm Sp} F(Z),$$

where the factor $F(1) \approx 1/1.976$ (a fractional approximation of the exact result), and the classical approximation (i.e. not including neoclassical effects) of the $Z$ dependence is:

$$F(Z) \approx \frac{1+1.198Z+0.222Z^2}{1+2.966Z+0.753Z^2}$$.

In the presence of a strong magnetic field (the collision rate is small compared to the gyrofrequency), there are two resistivities corresponding to the current perpendicular and parallel to the magnetic field. The transverse Spitzer resistivity is given by $\eta_\perp = \eta_{Sp}$, where the rotation keeps the distribution Maxwellian, effectively removing the factor of $F(Z)$.

The parallel current is equivalent to the unmagnetized case, $\eta_\parallel = \eta_{\rm Sp}^\prime$.

== Disagreements with observation ==
Measurements in laboratory experiments and computer simulations have shown that under certain conditions, the resistivity of a plasma tends to be much higher than the Spitzer resistivity. This effect is sometimes known as anomalous resistivity or neoclassical resistivity. It has been observed in space and effects of anomalous resistivity have been postulated to be associated with particle acceleration during magnetic reconnection. There are various theories and models that attempt to describe anomalous resistivity and they are frequently compared to the Spitzer resistivity.
