= Wendelstein II-B =

WII-B
Wendelstein II-B
- The original Wendelstein II-B, preserved in the entrance hall of IPP Greifswald.
- Device type: Stellarator
- Location: Garching, West Germany
- Affiliation: Max Planck Institute for Plasma Physics

Technical specifications
- Major radius: 0.5 m (1 ft 8 in)
- Minor radius: 0.05 m (2.0 in)
- Magnetic field: 1.25 T (12,500 G)
- Plasma temperature: < 300 eV

History
- Year(s) of operation: 1971–1975
- Preceded by: Wendelstein II-A
- Succeeded by: Wendelstein 7-A

Wendelstein II-B (WII-B) was a stellarator operated from 1971 at the Max Planck Institute for Plasma Physics.

== Background and Development ==
Its predecessor, Wendelstein II-A, was built after the poor plasma fuel confinement performance of Germany's first stellarator, Wendelstein I-A. This earliest stellarator's poor confinement was discovered to have the same underlying cause as that of Princeton Model C stellarator. The Model C was at the time the USA's flagship fusion machine, and one of the largest fusion experiments in the world. This failure prompted a US shift to the tokamak type exclusively from 1969, following the success of the Soviet T-3 tokamak. The Germans were encouraged by contrary positive results on Wendelstein II-A (WII-A), and continued stellarator research.

Despite its superior confinement properties, exhibiting classical transport rather than Bohm diffusion, WII-A was nonetheless much smaller than the Model C, limiting peak plasma temperature and density. Its immediate successor WII-B was planned to be the same size, but with significantly stronger external magnets, which should also improve plasma confinement, temperature, and density. WII-B was a circular classical stellarator, with two pairs of helical electromagnetic coils to produce the stellarator magnetic field, and five field periods around the torus. It was heated only by gun injection or Ohmic heating and had relatively low heating power.

== Results and Significance ==
In Germany, WII-B demonstrated tokamak-like plasma confinement with temperatures up to 300eV. It used fusion-relevant hydrogen plasmas, rather than heavy barium and caesium of earlier German stellarator experiments, with plasma parameters equivalent to those of similar sized tokamaks.

WII-B began operation the same year as the Princeton conversion of the Model C to a tokamak, whence Model C was renamed the Symmetrical Tokamak. Stellarator research ended in the US for almost two decades, but continued in Germany, the USSR, Japan, and the UK. In Germany it was followed by the larger and more powerful Wendelstein 7-A stellarator.

== Related experiments ==
- Saturn-1, USSR
- CLASP, UK
- Model C stellarator, USA
