= Wendelstein 7-A =

W7-A
Wendelstein 7-A
- The magnetic coil configuration of W7-A (black and red).
- Device type: Stellarator
- Location: Garching, West Germany
- Affiliation: Max Planck Institute for Plasma Physics

Technical specifications
- Major radius: 2 m (6 ft 7 in)
- Minor radius: 0.11–0.12 m (4.3 in – 4.7 in)
- Plasma volume: 0.6 m^{3}
- Magnetic field: 3.4 T (34,000 G)
- Heating power: 2.9 MW (Ohmic heating, 200 kW ECRH, 500 kW ICRH, 1.2 MW NBI)
- Plasma current: 0-45 kA
- Plasma temperature: <1.5 keV
- Plasma density: 1×10^{20} m^{−3}

History
- Year(s) of operation: 1975–1985
- Preceded by: Wendelstein II-B
- Succeeded by: Wendelstein 7-AS

Links
- Website: https://www.ipp.mpg.de/3951949/wendelstein7a

Wendelstein 7-A was a stellarator operated between 1975 and 1985 at the Max Planck Institute for Plasma Physics. In 1980 the stellarator showed that it could confine plasma fusion fuel, necessary for fusion power by magnetic confinement, without a current in the plasma. This was a major result because the current could drive various plasma instabilities, and was also inherent to the operation of the main competing device type, the tokamak. When plasma current was reduced below 5 kA in Wendelstein 7-A, the entire class of magnetohydrodynamic instabilities was no longer observed.

== Background and Development ==
Design work on the large current-free stellarator began as early as 1969, the same year in which the Princeton Model C stellarator was converted to a tokamak, ending US stellarator research until 1984. Both decisions immediately followed the 3rd IAEA international fusion energy conference in 1968, at which favourable results were reported on the Soviet T-3 tokamak and the German Wendelstein II-A stellarator.

Like Wendelstein II-A, the larger Wendelstein 7-A was a circular classical stellarator, with two pairs of helical electromagnetic coils to produce the stellarator magnetic field, and five field periods around the torus. One key feature of the new stellarator was the addition of neutral beam injection (NBI) for heating the plasma. This enabled zero current operation because earlier heating systems, particularly Ohmic heating, created a plasma current as an inherent part of the heating process, even if it was not required for stellarator plasma confinement and not desired by the experiment operators.

== Results and Significance ==
Wendelstein 7-A was successfully operated with plasma first heated by current-driving Ohmic heating, which was then switched off and replaced with NBI to maintain the temperature. With all heating now provided by NBI, the plasma current would decay while the hot plasma itself could be maintained even at high densities with moderate NBI heating power.

The experiment gave a major boost to the stellarator line. Its 1980 results shown at the 8th IAEA international fusion energy conference were reported as demonstrating a four times increase in energy confinement time when Ohmic heating current was switched off, and a triple product five times higher than a tokamak of comparable size. It was cited by pre-eminent plasma physicist Vitaly Shafranov in concluding in 1980 that, "there is no doubt: plasma can be confined in stellarators no less satisfactorily and possibly even more satisfactorily than in tokamaks".

It was succeeded at the Max Planck Institute by the considerably developed Wendelstein 7-AS stellarator, with modular coils enabling numerical optimization of the magnetic field.

== Related experiments ==
- Saturn-1, USSR
- CLASP, UK
