= Wendelstein =

Wendelstein may refer to:

- Wendelstein (mountain), a mountain in the Chiemgau
- Wendelstein, Bavaria, a town in the district of Roth in Bavaria, Germany
- two experimental stellarators (nuclear fusion reactors) of the Max-Planck-Institut für Plasmaphysik:
  - The Wendelstein 7-AS is located in Garching near Munich, Germany
  - Its successor, the Wendelstein 7-X operating in Greifswald, Germany
