= Wendelstein II-A =

WII-A
Wendelstein II-A
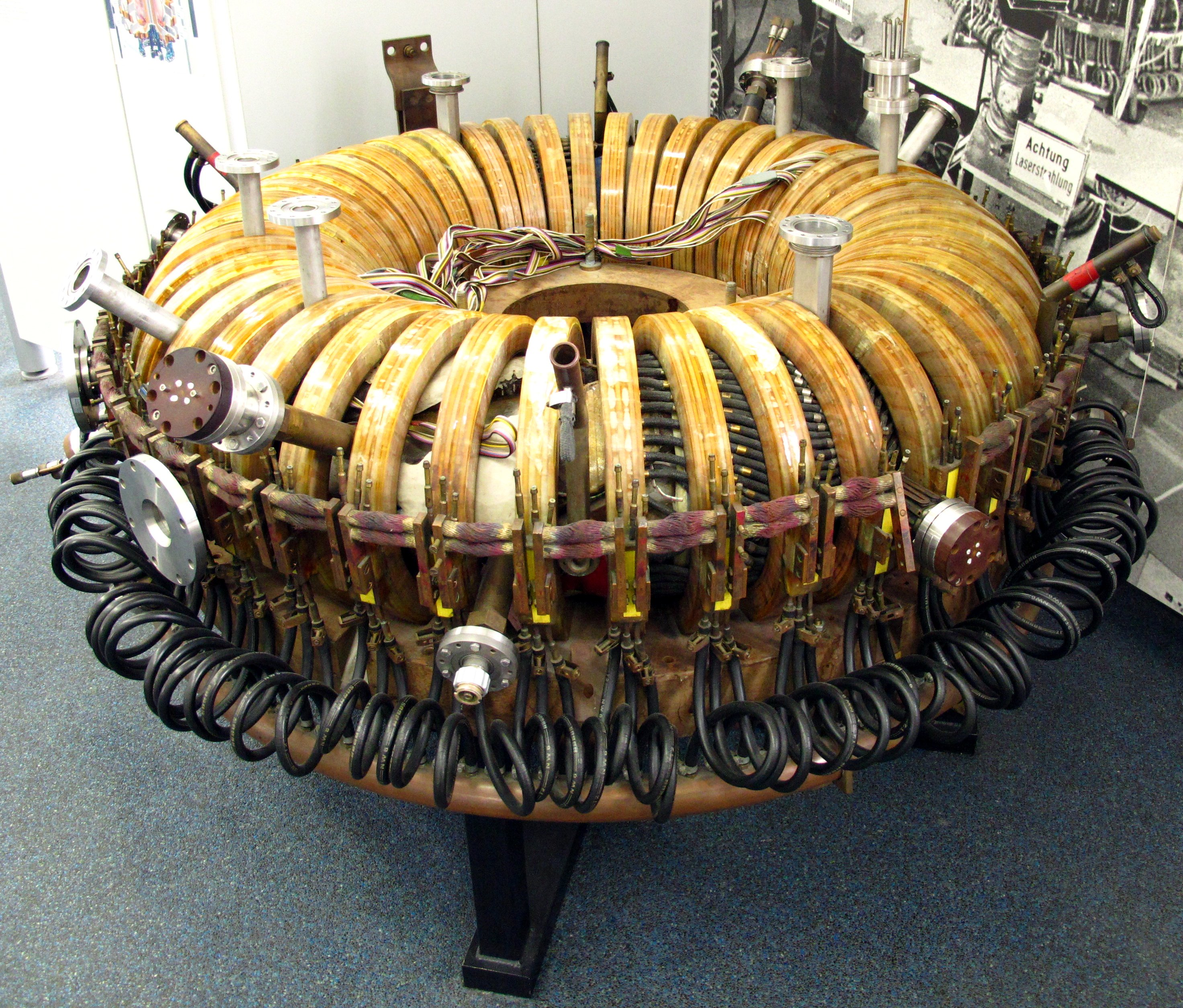
- The original Wendelstein II-A, preserved in the Deutsches Museum.
- Device type: Stellarator
- Location: Garching, West Germany
- Affiliation: Max Planck Institute for Plasma Physics

Technical specifications
- Major radius: 0.5 m (1 ft 8 in)
- Minor radius: 0.05 m (2.0 in)
- Magnetic field: 0.6 T (6,000 G)
- Heating power: Ohmic heating
- Plasma density: < 3.5×10^{15} m^{−3}

History
- Year(s) of operation: 1968–1975
- Preceded by: Wendelstein I-B
- Succeeded by: Wendelstein II-B

Wendelstein II-A (WII-A) was the first circular classical stellarator to be built in Germany, at the Max Planck Institute for Plasma Physics (IPP). It showed world-leading hot plasma confinement for a stellarator at the time, which was reported at the 1968 3rd IAEA Fusion Energy Conference. This result was pivotal in justifying the continuation of stellarator research given the record-breaking T-3 tokamak results shown at the same conference.

== Background and Development ==
The IPP was founded in Germany in 1960, to support a national nuclear fusion program. It began investigating a number of device types, one of which was the stellarator. The stellarator was previously only pursued in the USA, where it was the flagship national device at Princeton Plasma Physics Laboratory.

In 1961, the US's leading stellarator and the first German stellarator, Wendelstein I-A (WI-A), reported poor plasma fuel confinement at the first IAEA fusion energy conference. Both devices exhibited Bohm Diffusion, a trend whereby confinement drops with increasing temperature. As fusion requires very high temperatures, this is deleterious for fusion power.

Both the USA's Model C and WII-A's own predecessors, WI-A and Wendelstein I-B (WI-B), had had 'racetrack' configurations, where straight sections were combined with curved sections. Only the curved sections produced the stellarator rotational transform needed to confine plasma, and it was believed at the time that the circularizers that transitioned from curved to straight sections were a cause of loss of confinement on the Model C.

Careful investigations by the IPP group, however, found that neither the curved stellarator field nor the racetrack configuration was responsible for Bohm diffusion. Instead, it was due to the fact that both WI-A and the Princeton machine had sections with three pairs of helical electromagnetic coils producing the stellarator magnetic field. The German group found that Bohm diffusion disappeared in an equivalent tokamak-like configuration and in the stellarator if it was modified from three to two pairs of helical coils. WI-B was the same racetrack machine as WI-A, but with this coil number modification, and it showed good confinement of plasma fuel.

WII-A was the successor to WI-B, combining all the most advanced stellarator features known at that time. Like WI-B, it had two pairs of helical electromagnetic coils to produce the stellarator magnetic field. It was also circular, unlike the then-ubiquitous racetrack stellarators, with five field periods around the torus. WII-A was also significantly larger than WI-B, with about ten times the plasma volume.

== Results and Significance ==
WII-A used barium plasmas rather than hydrogen, meaning that probes were not needed and the plasma could be diagnosed with simple optical methods. The stellarator was found to have classical transport, a very low level and qualitatively much better than WI-A and Model C, which suffered from Bohm diffusion. This, and the similar result on its predecessor, were the first demonstrations of classical confinement in any toroidal device.

These results were presented at the 3rd Fusion Energy Conference of the IAEA in Novosibirsk in 1968, alongside the USSR's record-breaking results from its T-3 tokamak. Following initial skepticism of the German success at the previous conference in 1965, they showed definitively that the problems on Model C were a "Princeton Mystery" and not, as had hitherto been talked about, a "Munich Mystery". Stellarator research ceased in the USA, but continued in Germany, Japan, and the USSR itself.

Due to the success of its experiments, a follow-on stellarator Wendelstein II-B was built with similar design and more powerful magnetic fields, and its own considerably larger successor Wendelstein 7-A was specified while WII-A was still operating.

== Related experiments ==
- Saturn-1, USSR
- CLASP, UK
- Model C stellarator, USA
