= Contributions to Plasma Physics =

Scientific journal

- Discipline: Plasma physics
- Language: English
- Edited by: Karl Krieger

Publication details
- Former name: Beitraege aus der Plasmaphysik (1960—1984)
- History: 1960—present
- Publisher: Wiley
- Frequency: 10/year
- Impact factor: 1.1 (2025)

Standard abbreviations
- ISO 4: Contrib. Plasma Phys.

Indexing
- CODEN: CPPHEP
- ISSN: 0863-1042 (print); 1521-3986 (web)

Links
- Journal homepage; Online access; Online archive

Contributions to Plasma Physics is a peer-reviewed scientific journal published by Wiley. It covers experimental, theoretical, and numerical contributions in plasma physics. Established as a German language publication in 1960 under the title Beitraege aus der Plasmaphysik, it was renamed to its current title in 1985. Its current editor-in-chief is Karl Krieger (Max Planck Institute for Plasma Physics).

== Abstracting and indexing ==
The journal is abstracted and indexed in:

- Current Contents/Physical, Chemical & Earth Sciences
- EBSCO databases
- Ei Compendex
- Inspec
- ProQuest databases
- Science Citation Index Expanded
- Scopus

According to the Journal Citation Reports, the journal has a 2025 impact factor of 1.1.
