= Saturn-1 (stellarator) =

Soviet stellarator experiment (1970–c. 1980)

- Device type: Stellarator
- Location: Kharkov (Kharkiv), Soviet Union (Ukraine)
- Affiliation: Kharkov Physiotechnical Institute

Technical specifications
- Major radius: 35.6 cm (14.0 in)
- Minor radius: 8.6 cm (3.4 in)
- Magnetic field: <1.0 T (10,000 G)
- Plasma temperature: < 1.7 keV (electrons) < 1.0 keV (ions)
- Plasma density: 2×10^{16} m^{−3}

History
- Year(s) of operation: March 1970–c. 1980

Saturn-1 is a concluded torsatron-type stellarator magnetic confinement fusion experiment at the Kharkov Physiotechnical Institute in Kharkov in the Soviet Union, which began operating in 1970. It was built shortly after the results of the Soviet T-3 tokamak led Princeton to convert its Model C stellarator into a tokamak.

The head of the Soviet tokamak program, Lev Artsimovich, pushed for an end to the Soviet stellarator program too. It went ahead anyway at the decision of Efim Slavsky, Soviet minister for the nuclear industry, in honour of the recently deceased physicist Igor Kurchatov. Kurchatov had directed the foundation of the stellarator center in Ukraine and had been a friend of Slavsky. Saturn-1 was the first torsatron in the world, and the first of a series of Kharkiv torsatrons, continued in independent Ukraine, that includes Uragan-2M.

Saturn-1 was a circular classical stellarator, with three pairs of helical electromagnetic coils to produce the stellarator magnetic field, and eight field periods around the torus. It could also be operated as a torsatron, i.e. without current in planar toroidal field coils, but with current in the helical coils all flowing in the same direction rather than counter-propagating.

Measurements of the magnetic field using an electron gun showed that the stellarator contained good magnetic flux surfaces, which was then an important open question in magnetic confinement fusion research. Soviet researchers had also calculated the expected surfaces, and the calculations agreed with their measurements. It was also among the first devices to observe that fast ions were lost disproportionately compared with thermal ions, a problem that remained open in stellarator design into the 2020s.

== Related experiments ==
- CLASP, UK
- Wendelstein II-A, West Germany
- Wendelstein II-B, West Germany
