= Max Planck Institute for Plasma Physics =

German research institute

Coordinates: 48°15′47.322″N 11°40′19.409″E

Max Plank Institute for Plasma Physics
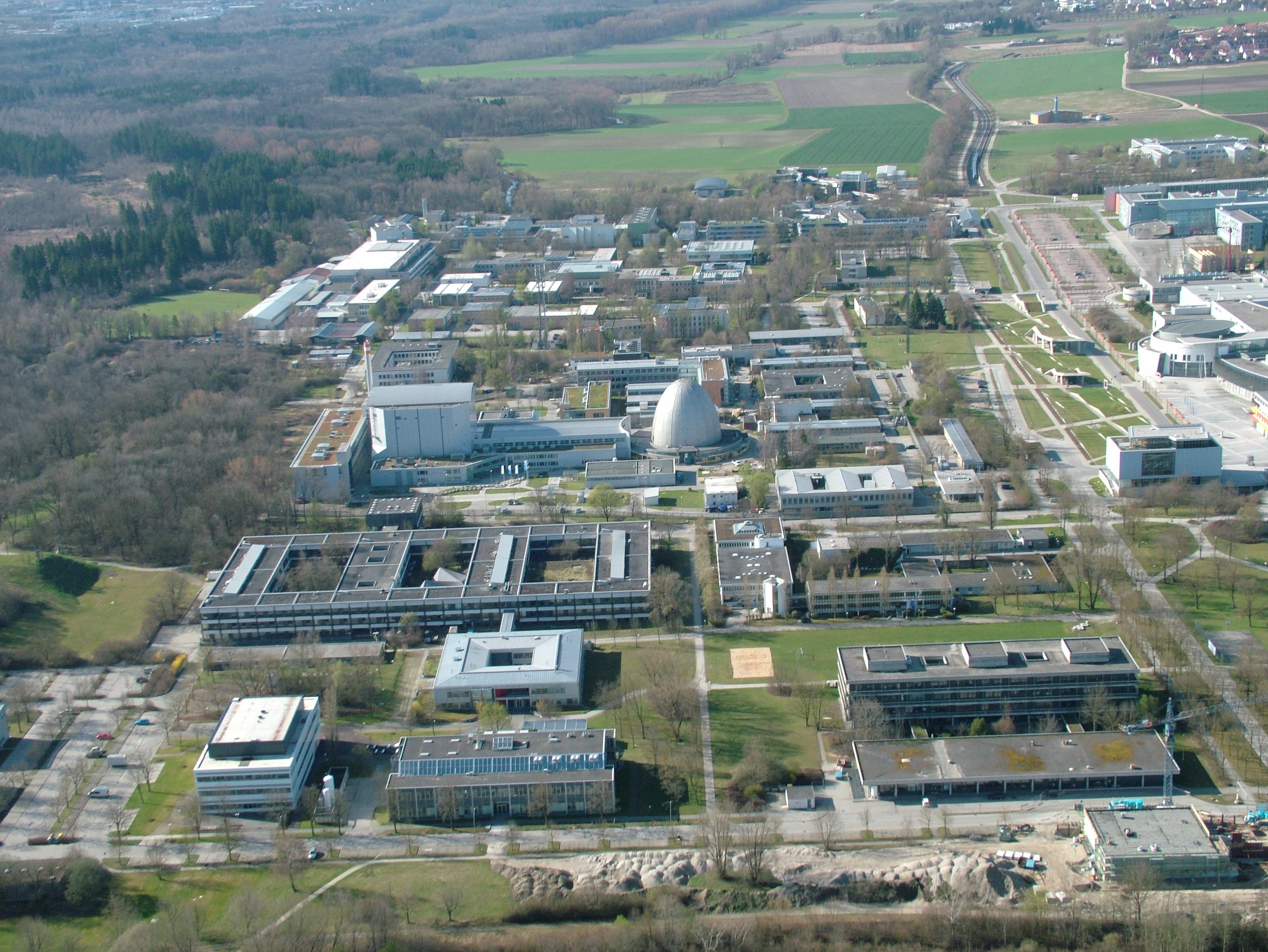
- IPP buildings on Campus Garching.
- Established: 1960
- Chair: Prof. Dr. Sibylle Günter
- Location: Garching, Munich, Germany
- Website: https://www.ipp.mpg.de/en

The Max Planck Institute for Plasma Physics (German: Max-Planck-Institut für Plasmaphysik, IPP) is a physics institute investigating the physical foundations of a fusion power plant. The IPP is an institute of the Max Planck Society, part of the European Atomic Energy Community, and an associated member of the Helmholtz Association. It has two sites, one at Garching near Munich and a second at Greifswald, both in Germany.

== History ==
IPP was founded in 1960. A driving force was Nobel laureate Werner Heisenberg, who was post-war director of the Max Planck Institute for Physics. While Heisenberg remained at the Institute for Physics, he personally put up part of the capital required for the IPP's foundation. Its major early research funder was Euratom.

The IPP has operated a series of pinch machines, stellarators, and tokamaks. Its first stellarator, Wendelstein I-A, started operation as early as 1960. It was followed by Wendelstein II-A in 1968, which operated in time to provide results to the 3rd IAEA Fusion Energy Conference in the USSR, where the world record T-3 tokamak results were presented. A much smaller machine, Wendelstein II-A did not match the tokamak in terms of temperature or density, but unlike the Princeton Model C stellarator it did show that, like the tokamak, it was not limited by Bohm Diffusion.

Inspired by this success, Wendelstein II-A was followed by a substantially similar stellarator with stronger magnets, Wendelstein II-B, while its own successor was being designed. Wendelstein 7-A began operation in 1975. A much larger machine with stronger magnets, it demonstrated tokamak-like performance and, in 1980, operation without a driven plasma current, which stabilised magnetohydrodynamic instabilities.

The first optimized stellarator, Wendelstein 7-AS, followed it into operation in 1988. In 1994, a second site was founded at Greifswald to build Wendelstein 7-X, the world's largest stellarator.

IPP Garching has operated the tokamaks since Pulsator, the first German tokamak, which began operation in 1973. It was followed since 1980 by the tokamaks ASDEX and ASDEX Upgrade. Until the tokamak ceased operations in 2023, the IPP collaborated with the Culham Centre for Fusion Energy in the UK on the Euratom JET tokamak project.

Notable discoveries include H-mode on the ASDEX tokamak under Friedrich Wagner, who also pioneered modular coils on the Wendelstein 7-AS stellarator, and the discovery of computable approximate quasisymmetry configurations for stellarators under Jürgen Nührenberg in collaboration with External Scientific Member Allen Boozer, for which they were awarded the 2010 Hannes Alfvén Prize by the European Physical Society.

== Current activities ==
Currently it operates several large devices. These include the world's largest stellarator, Wendelstein 7-X. It also operates the tokamak ASDEX Upgrade since 1991. In addition to magnetic confinement fusion experiments, it also operates a tandem accelerator and a high heat flux test facility (GLADIS)

The IPP cooperates closely with the ITER and DEMO projects.

The International Helmholtz Graduate School for Plasma Physics partners with the Technical University of Munich (TUM) and the University of Greifswald. Associated partners are the Leibniz Institute for Plasma Science and Technology (INP) in Greifswald and the Leibniz Computational Center (LRZ) in Garching.

== See also ==
- List of plasma physics software
