= Wendelstein 7-AS =

Stellarator for plasma fusion experiments (1988-2002)

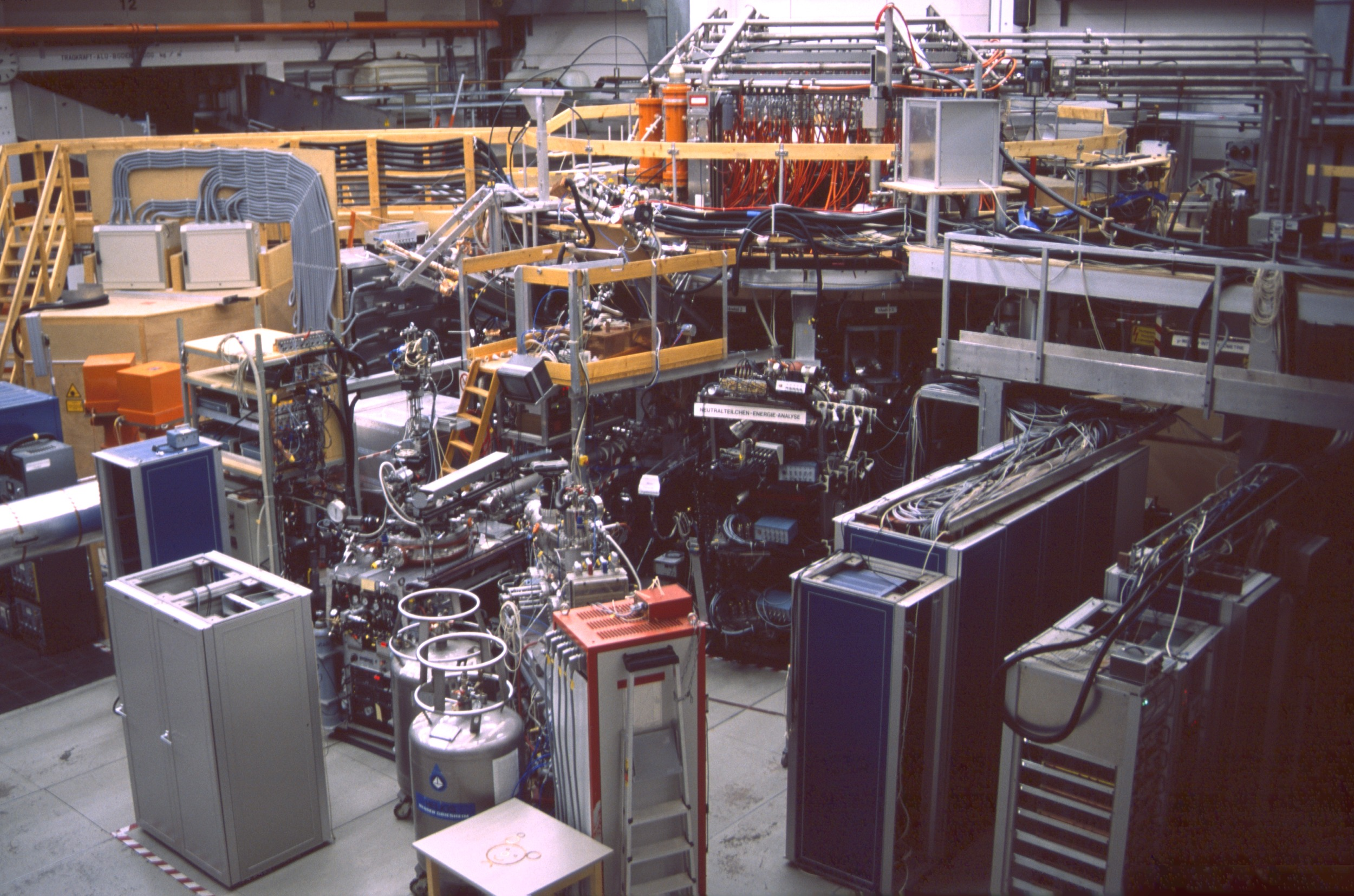
- Wendelstein 7-AS in Garching. The stellarator - at the rear right - is almost covered by diagnostic and heating components.
- Device type: Stellarator
- Location: Garching, Germany
- Affiliation: Max Planck Institute for Plasma Physics

Technical specifications
- Major radius: 2 m (6 ft 7 in)
- Minor radius: 0.13–0.18 m (5.1 in – 7.1 in)
- Plasma volume: approx. 1 m^{3}
- Magnetic field: up to 2.6 T (26,000 G)
- Heating power: 5.3 MW (2.3 MW ECRH, 3 MW NBI)
- Discharge duration: up to 2 s
- Plasma temperature: < 1.7 keV (ions) < 7 keV (electrons)
- Plasma density: < 4×10^{20} m^{−3}

History
- Date(s) of construction: 1983-1988
- Year(s) of operation: 1988–2002
- Preceded by: Wendelstein 7-A
- Succeeded by: Wendelstein 7-X

Wendelstein 7-AS (abbreviated W7-AS, for "Advanced Stellarator") was an experimental stellarator for fusion power. It was in operation from 1988 to 2002 by the Max Planck Institute for Plasma Physics (IPP) in Garching. It succeeded Wendelstein 7-A, a conventional circular stellarator that had demonstrated plasma confinement without a plasma current, a key potential advantage of the stellarator type. Wendelstein 7-AS was about the same size and with weaker magnets, but also the first in a new class of advanced stellarators with modular coils allowing the stellarator magnetic field to be shaped to maximize favorable and minimise unfavorable physical properties.

Using this new modular coil technology, Wendelstein 7-AS was the first optimized stellarator. It was optimized for a number of properties. One was to minimize currents that are self-generated in operation, such as the Pfirsch–Schluter current and the bootstrap current. This was in addition to eliminating externally driven currents as in Wendelstein 7-A. Another was to minimize the geodesic curvature, which had the effect both of reducing neoclassical transport and also the Shafranov shift, the latter allowing the machine to confine plasmas with higher pressure. Wendelstein 7-AS was thus the first stellarator to be designed to approximate isodynamicity in its magnetic field.

Its successor Wendelstein 7-X began construction in Greifswald in 2002 and operated from December 2015. Its goal is to investigate the prospects of a future fusion power plant based on this stellarator technology. It features an improved approximation of isodynamicity, a thirty times larger volume, superconducting magnets, and a water cooled divertor for steady state operation.

== Experimental design ==
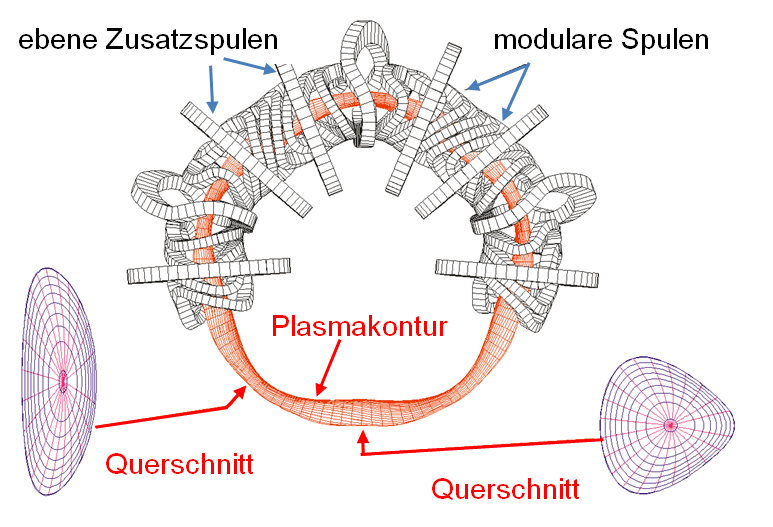
Top view of the magnetic coil system of the Wendelstein 7-AS. The position of the plasma in it is shown in red. The cross-section of the plasma changes five times along the ring, each from an upright elliptical shape (bottom left) to a more teardrop shape (bottom right) and back.

Wendelstein 7-AS was a stellarator, a device which generates the magnetic fields necessary for the confinement of a hot hydrogen plasma via current-carrying coils outside the plasma. They are potential candidates for fusion reactors designed for continuous operation as the current exclusively flows on the outside of the machine, in contrast to the tokamak which generates the confining magnetic fields from the current that flows within the plasma itself.

It was the successor to the IPP's previous stellarator experiment, Wendelstein 7-A, which had demonstrated operation without plasma current in 1980. Wendelstein 7-AS continued this philosophy of minimizing or eliminating the plasma current, which was shown on its predecessor to eliminate many instabilities, especially magnetohydrodynamic instabilities. Wendelstein 7-AS also added new goals, such as good flux surfaces and stability at higher plasma pressure. For this, direct design of the field itself was needed, which required greater control over the shape of the external coils.

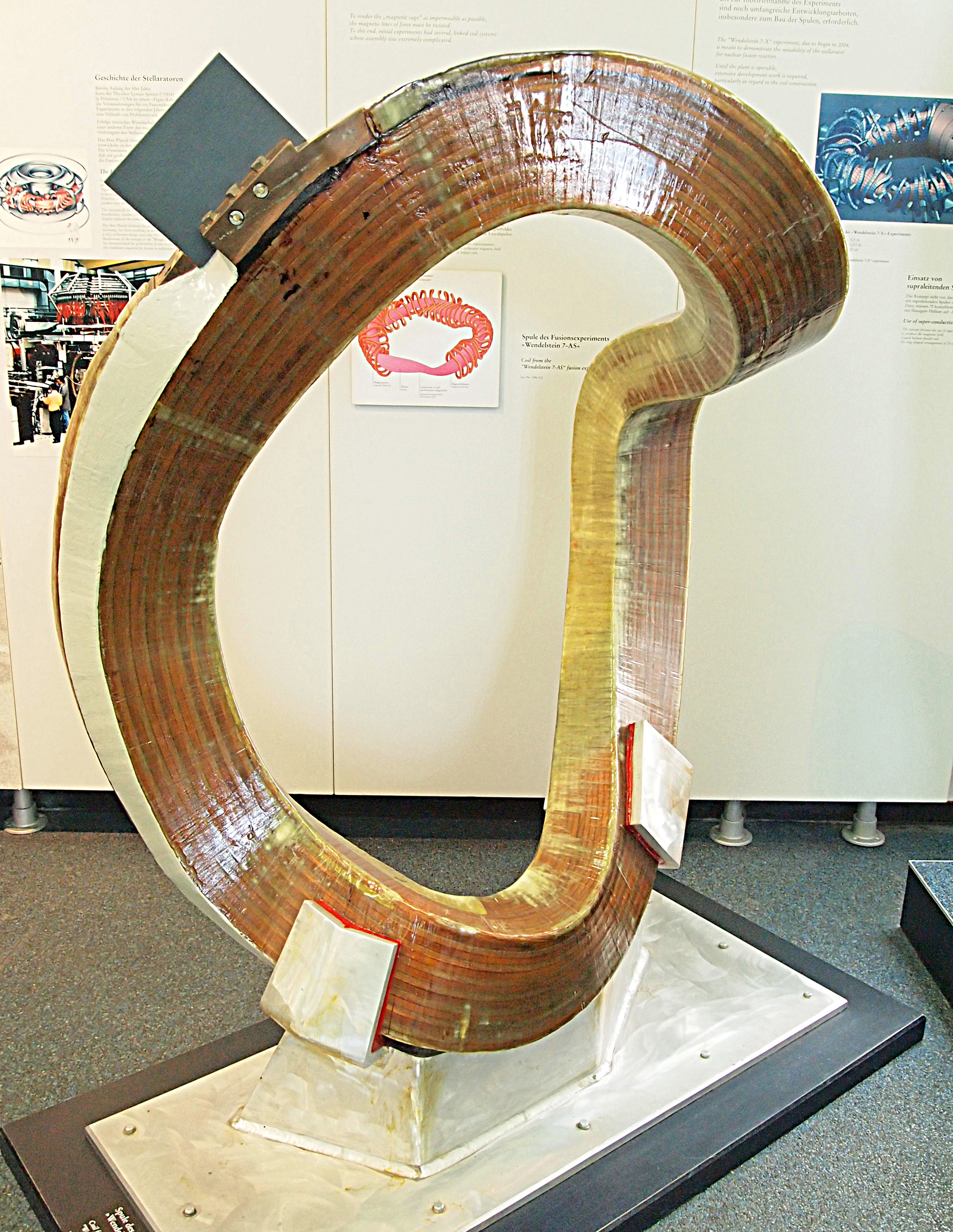
One of the characteristic optimized non-planar coils, exhibited in the Deutsches Museum.

Wendelstein 7-AS was the first in the Wendelstein series of IPP stellarator experiments to have a modular coil system that creates the twisted magnetic fields necessary to confine the plasma. It was designed to give the magnetic fields more degrees of freedom that allowed it shaped closer to the optimal theoretical configuration. On the successor device Wendelstein 7-X an enhanced optimization of the coil-generated magnetic field was carried out.

Wendelstein 7-AS also had strong external heating, especially for such a relatively small device. It had 2.3 MW of Electron Cyclotron Resonance Heating (i.e. microwave heating) and 2 MW of neutral beam injection heating. This was comparable to the larger contemporaneous Princeton Large Torus tokamak. Large heating power allowed Wendelstein 7-AS to reach high plasma pressures and test the quality of its field optimisation in practice. Neutral beams allowed it to be heated without driving a plasma current.

== Project results ==
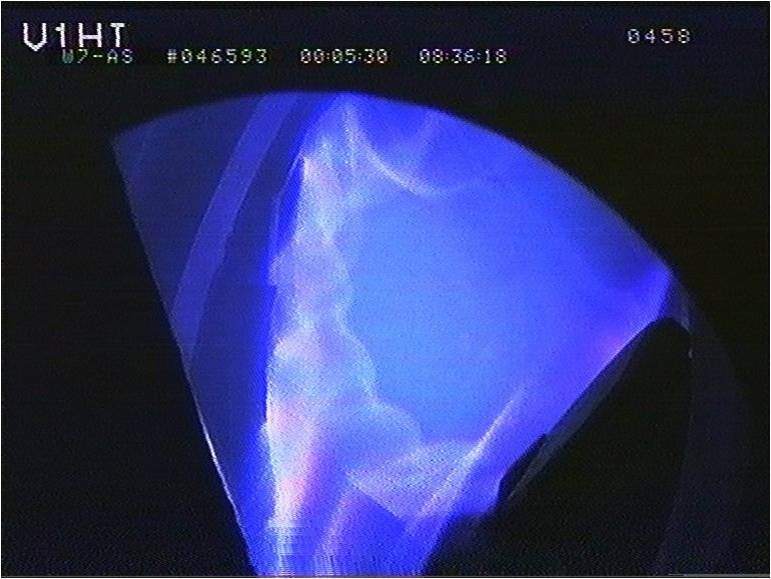
A look through a vacuum window in the toroidal direction and along the plasma in W7-AS. The "cold" edge of the plasma appears bright, showing bulbous island structures in the center of the picture that press against the graphite tiles of the wall (left side). The radiated heat emitted at the hot center of the plasma tube (right side, approximately 30 cm in diameter) is near the X-ray spectrum and is invisible to the camera; the plasma therefore appears diffuse and transparent.

The following experimental results confirmed the predictions of a partially optimized Wendelstein 7-AS and led to the development and construction of the Wendelstein 7-X:

- The magnetic field was able to trap plasma particles (mostly hydrogen ions and electrons) with higher thermal energies than its predecessors. This improvement made it possible to reach temperatures eight times higher than the internal temperature of the Sun (inside the plasma ring for electrons), and slightly more (internal temperature of the Sun) for hydrogen ions.
- Furthermore, it was shown that the partially optimized stellarator behaves extraordinarily "good-natured" with regard to plasma instabilities, which is of great importance for the continuous operation of a future reactor. Instabilities can lead to temporary cooling or the loss of hot plasma particles and thus reduce the plasma pressure and temperatures inside the vessel.
- A so-called island divertor was successfully operated on the Wendelstein 7-AS – the first time on a stellarator; this removes contaminants from the plasma that would additionally cool the hot plasma inside. For this purpose, the magnetic field lines at the edge of the plasma were deformed in such a way that multi-charged ions of the hot plasma hit targeted baffle plates and distribute their energy as cheaply as possible, thereby avoiding local overheating.
- The Wendelstein 7-AS was the first stellarator access the H-mode (H for "high confinement"), which was previously only accessible to tokamaks. This allows it to easily achieve ignition conditions of a fusion reactor as the plasma is able to develop an insulating layer a few centimeters thick from the edge of the machine, allowing for higher temperatures inside.

The stellarator ultimately achieved high temperatures and densities, although as in many experiments peak values were not achieved in both simultaneously, close to those required for a fusion power plant. Its fusion triple product was higher than many past tokamak experiments of similar size. It was a major step forward in the development of stellarators as a whole, and demonstration that they were a viable alternative to the tokamak for fusion power.
