= Princeton Large Torus =

Experimental fusion reactor, first to hit 75 million degrees

PLT
Princeton Large Torus
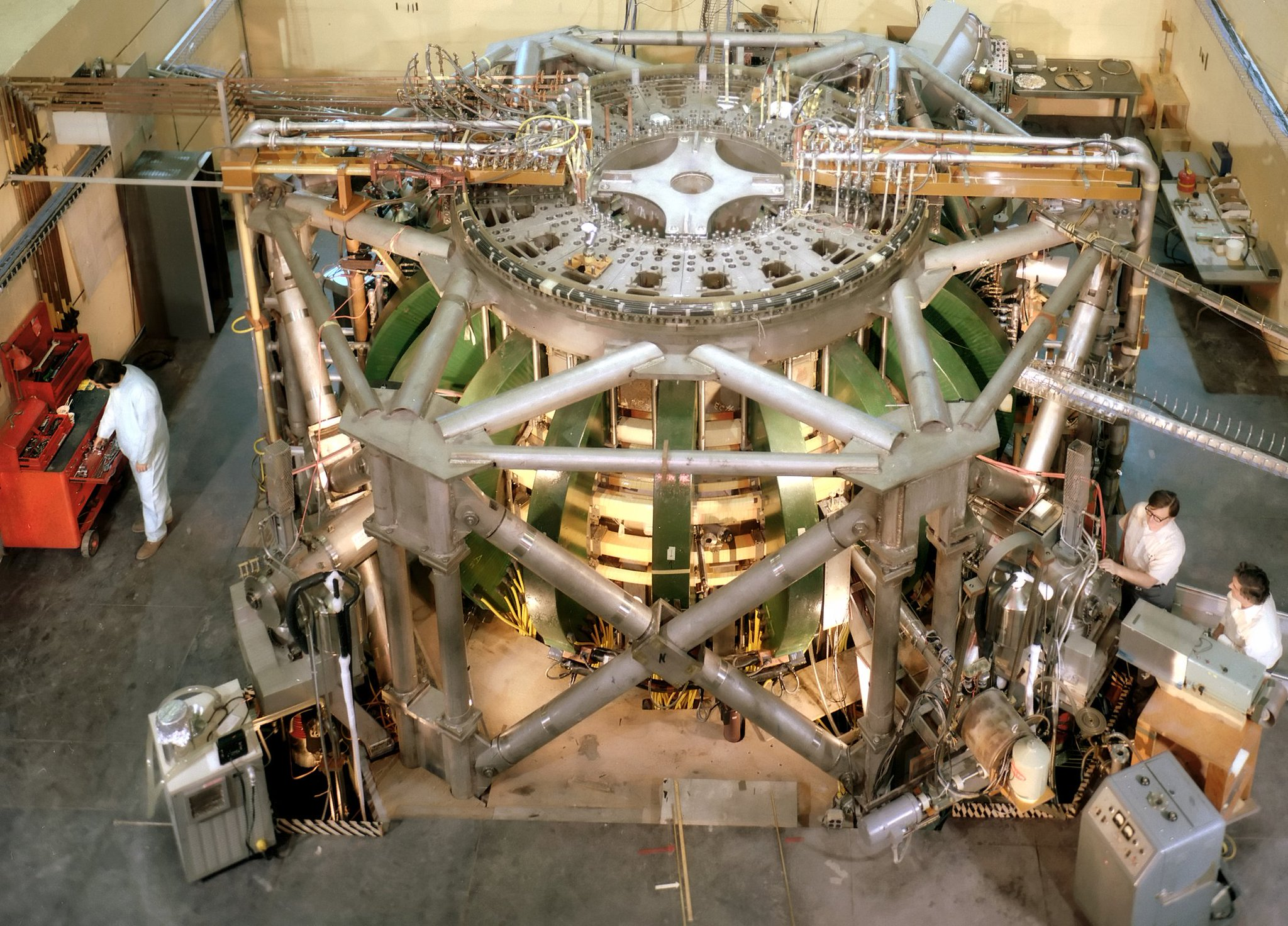
- The PLT in 1975. Toroidal coils are visible in green.
- Device type: Tokamak
- Location: Princeton, New Jersey, United States
- Affiliation: Princeton Plasma Physics Laboratory

Technical specifications
- Major radius: 1.32 m (4 ft 4 in)
- Minor radius: 0.4 m (1 ft 4 in)
- Magnetic field: 4 T (40,000 G)
- Heating power: 5 MW (ICRH); 3 MW (NBI); 1 MW (LH)
- Plasma current: 700 kA
- Plasma temperature: 7 keV (ions)

History
- Date(s) of construction: 1972
- Year(s) of operation: 1975–1986
- Preceded by: Symmetrical Tokamak (ST)
- Succeeded by: Tokamak Fusion Test Reactor (TFTR)
- Related devices: Adiabatic Toroidal Compressor (ATC)

The Princeton Large Torus (or PLT), was an early tokamak built at the Princeton Plasma Physics Laboratory (PPPL). It was one of the first large scale tokamak machines and among the most powerful in terms of current and magnetic fields. Originally built to demonstrate that larger devices would have better confinement times, it was later modified to perform heating of the plasma fuel, a requirement of any practical fusion power device.

The tokamak gained new prominence in 1968, when the Soviet T-3 published new data showing higher temperatures and densities than any other fusion device. Initial skepticism lasted until British scientists verified the claims, and PPPL converted its Model C stellarator to tokamak configuration in 1969. PPPL's tokamak quickly reproduced the Soviet performance and then surpassed it. The next step in developing the system would be to build a larger machine to test whether the confinement time of the plasma scaled as expected. PLT was designed to not only be larger, but also have dramatically higher internal plasma currents on the order of 1 MA.

Another problem with the tokamak approach is that it does not directly heat its fuel to the required temperatures over 50 million Kelvin. Around the time that PLT was being built, Oak Ridge National Laboratory had successfully introduced the neutral beam injection heating concept, or NBI. NBI was added to PLT and it began setting record after record, eventually reaching 75 million K, well beyond the minimum needed for a practical fusion device. Its success was a matter of some controversy within the newly formed Department of Energy (DOE), who was at the same time looking to cut the fusion budget. This resulted in what was known as "the PLT weekend" when the press learned of the success and the DOE attempted to downplay it.

PLT's success led the way for plans to build an even larger machine capable of reaching breakeven, a long-sought goal in fusion power. This system emerged as the Tokamak Fusion Test Reactor, or TFTR. Originally slated to be built at Oak Ridge, PLT's success led to Princeton winning the TFTR contest as well, although its key heating system had been developed by Oak Ridge.

== History ==
=== The doldrums ===
When the physics of nuclear fusion was first put on a firm footing during the early 1950s, a string of proposed devices to harness that energy was quickly created. These all aimed to solve the problem of containing a plasma fuel that was heated to at least 50 million Kelvin, which would melt any substance. The trick used by most of these devices was to manipulate the plasma with magnetic fields; as the plasma consisted of free electrons and ions, it could carry an electrical current and was subject to magnetic forces.

Based on simple plasma diffusion theory, the amount of time it takes for an ion to escape from a magnetic bottle depends on the size of the bottle and the square of the power of its magnets. This means larger machines will be inherently better at confining their fuel, both because it has farther to go to get out, and because larger machines can host larger and more powerful magnets. The corollary is that small machines can tell you only so much about the performance of a design at the scale needed for a practical reactor; one would have to build an intermediate-sized machine and compare the plasma leakage rate to ensure it followed the expected scaling. There was some early doubt on this point; the only direct experience with plasmas, from the Manhattan Project, suggested the leakage rate was linear with the magnetic field. If this Bohm diffusion were true, a practical fusion reactor would likely be impossible.

Of the many early concepts for reactor designs, three systems came to the fore, the magnetic mirror, the z-pinch and the stellarator. Early examples demonstrated that they could confine plasma to the level expected of a small machine. The outlier was the pinch, which demonstrated obvious instabilities that were addressed with new magnets. These early devices led to larger and more powerful versions of these same concepts. These invariably failed to improve the plasma confinement, leaking fuel at unsustainable rates. Investigations led to several newly discovered instabilities that seemed to be an inherent part of all of these designs.

At the first international meeting on fusion in 1958, it was clear all of the devices were suffering from these issues. By the early 1960s, the entire field had descended into what became known as "the doldrums". Even Lyman Spitzer, one of fusion's greatest proponents, concluded Bohm diffusion appeared to be a fundamental limit.

=== Tokamak ===
At a similar meeting in 1965 at the recently opened Culham Centre for Fusion Energy in the UK, the Soviet team introduced preliminary results on a device they called the tokamak. Physically, it was very similar to the z-pinch concept, which had been extensively developed by the UK in the ZETA device and proved to be no more useful than other early systems, beset with instabilities. In contrast, the Soviets were claiming that their seemingly minor variation on ZETA was producing dramatically better results, about 10 times the Bohm limit. Their claims were dismissed out of hand, especially by Spitzer.

At the next meeting in 1968, in Novosibirsk, the Soviets presented much more data and all of it demonstrated their machines were producing confinement times from 10 to 100 times better than any other device. Once again, these results were met by skepticism. This time, however, the Soviets were prepared. The UK team working on ZETA had introduced a new diagnostic technique using lasers that Lev Artsimovich had called "brilliant". He invited the UK team to their lab, the heart of the Soviet bomb-making establishment, to make their own measurements. By the summer of 1969, the laser showed the tokamak was even better than the Soviet results suggested. They phoned into a meeting of US fusion researchers in August and told them the news before it was released publicly in November.

At first, there was little movement in the US, as each of the labs had its own design that they felt was more interesting. The directors of the fusion program within the Atomic Energy Commission (AEC) were interested in at least confirming or denying the Soviet results, but found the labs uninterested in such work. In particular, the AEC felt it would be easy to convert Princeton's Model C stellarator to a tokamak, but the lab's director, Harold Furth, refused to even consider it, dismissing the Soviet claims out of hand. Only Oak Ridge National Laboratory showed any interest; they had no other large-scale devices in planning and were open to giving the tokamak a try. As soon as plans were announced to this effect, Furth's boss Melvin B. Gottlieb had a lunchtime talk with Furth. The two returned from lunch to describe how to convert the Model C.

The conversion started in September 1969 and was completed eight months later as the rechristened the Symmetrical Tokamak. It immediately confirmed, then bested, the Soviet results. It appeared at last that a stable plasma configuration was possible and the road to practical fusion power was suddenly opened.

=== Tokamak rush ===
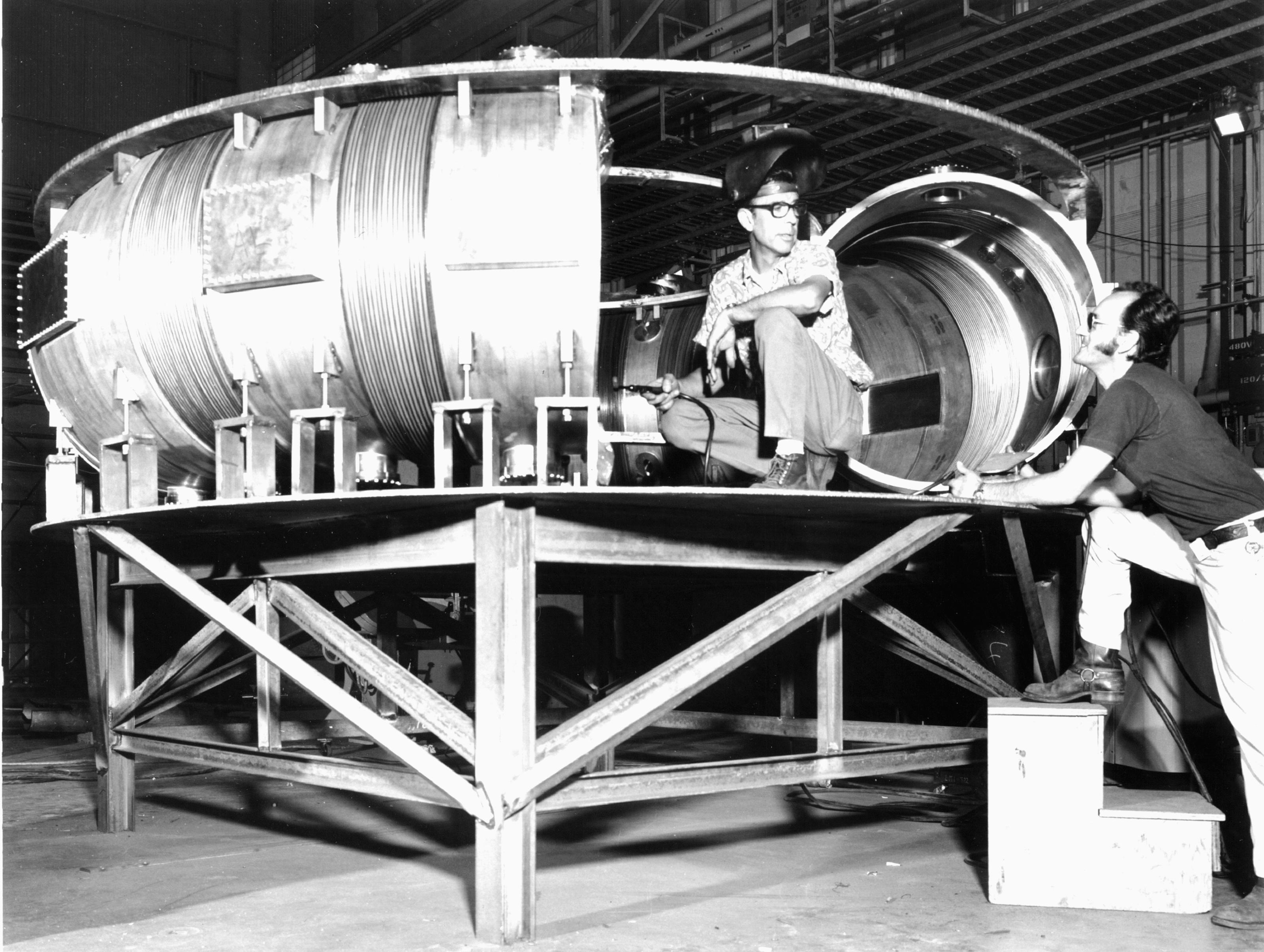
Vacuum vessel of the PLT under construction.

The success in confining plasma in smaller machines left many questions that would have to be answered. One was whether the tokamak scaled as expected; to test this, a larger machine with higher internal currents and magnetic fields would be needed. Another issue was how to heat the plasma; the tokamak lacked any significant self-heating so some form of external heating would be needed. Finally, some system would be needed to extract impurities from the plasma, both from the initial non-pure fuel as well as removing "fusion ash", the results of successful reactions (typically helium).

Of the three issues, the most obvious one was the extraction of impurities. It had long been understood that using a modified mass spectrometer would allow heavier ions to be removed. These were known as divertors, and Princeton's stellarator devices were among the first machines to use them. The style of diverter on the stellarators was not ideal for the tokamak, but Princeton had already solved that problem as part of their Floating Multipole-1 machine, which, before the tokamak, was one of the few other devices to demonstrate confinement times beyond the Bohm limit. To test whether their poloidal diverter would work in a tokamak configuration, plans began for a new small machine, the Poloidal Diverter Experiment, or PDX.

Heating was another issue, and there were many different ideas on how to do this. The stellarator also lacked self-heating, and to address this, Princeton had been carrying out experiments using ion cyclotron resonance heating. This uses powerful radio transmitters tuned to the rotational frequency of the ions, heating them in a fashion similar to the way a microwave oven heats water molecules. As this technology was already well understood, Princeton proposed a small test machine to try a different heating approach using plasma compression, like the earlier pinch machines, in a system known as the Adiabatic Toroidal Compressor (ATC). Other concepts included using turbulence in the plasma and the injection of hot ions into the fuel using small particle accelerators.

Finally, to test scaling, a larger machine with much more powerful magnets and internal currents would be needed. Initially, this was the main goal of the Princeton Large Torus, but allowances were made that new forms of heating could be added to the machine without serious disruption. The design was finalized in early 1971 and construction began later that year.

=== NBI ===
Oak Ridge did not have their own fusion design during the early days of the program, and concentrated instead on ways to keep fusion machines fueled. This led to the development of a series of small particle accelerators that shot fuel atoms into the plasma one at a time. This turned out to be an excellent way to heat the plasma as well, and Oak Ridge continued work on these lines using mirror reactors through the 1960s. When the Soviet results were announced, they began considering how to do the same with a tokamak. Their early calculations were not promising, but a visit by Bas Pease from the UK Culham fusion laboratory urged them to continue with this approach.

While PPPL had been debating whether to convert Model C to a stellarator, Oak Ridge had proposed building a new tokamak, ORMAK. This used a novel way to generate the magnetic field to make it more uniform, to meet or beat the performance of the Soviet TM-3 machine. In the second stage of development, they would add neutral beam heating. It was at this point, in June 1970, that the Symmetrical Tokamak began reporting initial results. Worried about being redundant, the Oak Ridge team decided to adapt the ORMAK's transformer cage as the basis for a much larger tokamak and add NBI immediately. Their machine was complete by late 1970, but bringing it into operation took most of 1971 and the first physics results were not being returned until early 1972. By 1973 the machine was operating sufficiently well that the lab began plans to turn on the NBI injectors.

PPPL was not willing to give up its leadership position and quickly hatched a plan to "scoop" Oak Ridge. They abandoned the compression heating technique in ATC and quickly fit low-power NBI to it. These demonstrated clear heating effects in 1973, before the NBI systems on ORMAK were operational. With this success, Oak Ridge began to fall from favour within the Washington Steering Committee.

=== Initial operations ===
It was around this time that two Soviet theorists published a paper describing a worrying new problem in the tokamak concept, the trapped-particle instability. This suggested that as the operating conditions of the reactor increased towards useful figures for a power-producing machine, they would become more unstable and eventually fling their fuel from the reactor. In 1975, Edwin Kintner, recently promoted by Hirsch to lead the fusion efforts in the AEC, decided this had to be tested immediately. He told Oak Ridge to "get on with it", and told PPPL to add NBI to its PLT design.

PLT had been under construction since 1972, and was well advanced at this point. It had been designed from the start with ample room to add any sort of heating system, so the demand for NBI was not particularly difficult to meet. It was expensive, however, but Kintner provided additional funding. PLT now became the focus of much of the US fusion establishment, with its mission being to "give a clear indication whether the tokamak concept plus auxiliary heating can form a basis for a future fusion reactor".

PLT was declared operational on 20 December 1975. The NBI additions began almost immediately, and the first two beams were operational by the fall of 1977. Early tests showed that the system was not gaining temperature as expected. Luckily, this turned out not to be due to the trapped-particle instability, of which no sign could be found. The problem was a simple one seen in many previous machines; impurities in the fuel were causing X-ray emissions that bled energy from the plasma. Nevertheless, by December the two beams were operating at 1.1 MeV and had raised the temperature to 25 million degrees.

The source of the impurities was quickly traced to a device known as a "limiter". In any plasma, the particles have a range of speeds, and the slower moving ones are not well confined and will eventually collide with the walls of the reactor. When this happens, they knock off atoms of the metal that poison the plasma. The solution is to add a small finger-shaped bit of metal that extends from the wall to just outside the desired plasma area. When these slower-moving particles begin to drift away, they hit the limiter before the wall, and are absorbed. The idea is to use some lightweight material for the limiter so those atoms that are knocked off do not poison the plasma to the same degree, but the aluminum material being used was found to fail this requirement.

For 1978, the team began plans to add another two NBI lines and replace the limiter with new material. They eventually selected graphite, whose carbon atoms would still spall into the plasma, but cause far less X-ray emissions when they did so.

=== Budget troubles ===
In January the new Carter administration took power and began plans to reorganize various branches of the government into the new Department of Energy (DOE). James Schlesinger, who had led the AEC from 1971 to 1973 during the early tokamak advances, returned to take the helm of the new branch. John M. Deutch was placed in control of the DOE's Office of Energy Research, and immediately began plans to cut $100 million from its budget.

In response, Kintner stated that the fusion research was critical, and shouldn't be cut without a good reason. He suggested forming a blue ribbon panel to make an in-depth study of the whole field. Given the go-ahead, Kintner managed to arrange John S. Foster Jr. to lead the panel. Published in June 1978, the "Final Report of the Ad Hoc Experts Group of Fusion" stated that "the momentum should be maintained", code for keeping the budget as is. However, it also suggested that the tokamak might not be the ultimate form of a fusion generator and that other approaches, like the magnetic mirror, should also be given time to mature so that they "could raise fusion to its highest level."

Furth of PPPL was not impressed, suggesting it would be an excuse to do nothing. But he had a plan to make their suggestions moot. By this time, in July 1978, PLT had completed the installation of two more NBI beams as well as a water-cooled graphite limiter. They were soon raising the NBI power to 2 MW at 4 kV, which produced a plasma temperature of 45 million degrees. This was well into the area where the trapped-particle problems should have occurred. Once again, no hint of it was seen.

=== Temperature milestone ===
On the night of July 24, they pushed the system further to 5.5 kV, hitting 60 million degrees. This was a milestone in the fusion program; PLT demonstrated that one could make a tokamak that could confine its plasma long enough to heat it to the temperatures needed in a practical reactor. The density of the plasma would have to be higher in a production machine, but PLT was hitting every other requirement.

The significance of the result was obvious, not only for physics, but also for the ongoing efforts in Washington; Deutch was preparing his report on the Foster Panel's suggestions, and this result would have an enormous positive benefit. Kinter was on holiday with his family at the time, and when they returned to their hotel in Stowe the next day the desk clerk told them there was a series of urgent messages waiting from Gottlieb. Kinter and Gottlieb agreed that the news should be saved for the next fusion meeting, being held in Innsbruck that fall.

As was the case for both ZETA and the original tokamaks, the news was too good to keep bottled up, and the story began appearing at the other fusion labs within days. On 31 July, Energy News ran a short front-page story talking about "persistent reports of a major breakthrough", prompting the DOE to plan for a 15 August press release instead of waiting until Innsbruck.

Morris Levitt, editor of Fusion magazine, called Gottlieb on 10 August and was told to hold off until the press release. Levitt then called the DOE for details and connected to someone who was unaware of the events and was told that there was no such press release coming. This was a serious mistake; Levitt's magazine was convinced there was a conspiracy to kill fusion research, and the denial from the DOE served to prove his suspicions.

Levitt immediately leaked the entire story to Dave Hess of the Knight Ridder wire service. Hess began following up and eventually reached Kinter. After being pressed on the topic, Kinter admitted that something interesting had happened but refused to provide details. This was catnip to the press, and Hess's story ran on the front page of the Miami Herald the next day, Saturday, 12 August.

=== PLT weekend ===
What resulted is now known as the "PLT weekend". Released on a slow news day, the story was picked up from the press wire by newspapers around the world. This included the Washington Post, and it was soon on the desks Deutch and Schlesinger. Neither of them would go on record with the newspapers, who were now clamouring for a statement from the DOE. That task ultimately fell to Stephen O. Dean, one of Kinter's senior directors, who appeared on CBS News that evening. Kinter himself was at Lawrence Livermore National Laboratory at the time, returning to Washington that night. As he drove home from the airport he heard the story on WTOP news radio.

Jim Bishop, the DOE's press spokesman, was livid. He accused Kintner of deliberately leaking the story in order to influence upcoming appropriations decisions. He then phoned Gottlieb to make the same accusations. Gottlieb stated he was still working on the original 15 August release and had said nothing to the press, but Bishop would not listen to him. Gottlieb then called William Bowen, Princeton's president, telling him that if they did not call off the attack he would hold his own press event and then resign. Bowen knew Schlesinger and called him, later telling Gottlieb that things would settle down.

When Kintner and Dean arrived for work on Monday morning, they were met by Eric Willis and told they were both being fired; Schlesinger was convinced Kintner had leaked and Dean had been happy to amplify that message on CBS. The night before, vice president Walter Mondale had written to Schlesinger demanding he prepare a memo on the events, adding to everyone's tension. Willis then went and talked to Schlesinger and Deutch, convincing them not to fire the two, and eventually agreeing to release a significantly toned-down press release.

The meeting took place later that night, attended by 75 reporters. Deutch did not let anyone else from the DOE talk, and told the press that it was a routine result that had long been expected and that lots of other energy programs were also making great progress. Gottlieb then spoke and explained the significance of the result, and how the lurking problem with trapped particles turned out not to exist. In the end, everyone was happy with the result. Kintner only met Schlesinger for the first time later, when Schlesinger was calmed down; Kintner promised there would not be a repeat performance and the two settled their difference.

Over the next week, news of PLT's success was reported around the world. Even Pravda was congratulatory, stating that "It would be incorrect to think that the advocates of the 'cold war' are taking the upper hand everywhere. News of an entirely different type is also being reported these days... Scientists at Princeton University have achieved a major success in the area of thermonuclear fusion. They succeeded in obtaining a temperature of 60 million degrees C in an experimental tokamak reactor. This was accomplished thanks to cooperation with Soviet scientists."

=== Innsbruck and Washington ===
The Innsbruck meeting took place in the last week of August 1978. Rob Goldston was selected to give the presentation on PLT, and armed himself with large amounts of experimental results. The meeting organizers arranged a special session for his presentation, and he was grilled by scientists from around the world. The two main issues were whether the results could be trusted and whether they were measuring the bulk temperature or just hot spots. Goldston showed results from four totally different types of sensors all giving the same result, and those results demonstrated the energies were indeed Maxwellian, as would be expected from a bulk temperature.

At the end of the presentation, Russian physicist Katerina Razumova presented Goldston with a hand-carved firebird, which in Slavic folklore, which brought fire to mankind from the sun. Gottlieb gave it a position in the PLT control room where it remained for years.

In September, Deutch presented his recommendations to Congress, based on the Foster reports. He rejected calls for the start of a machine after TFTR, and reiterated calls for the mirror program to continue its work as well. He called for the budget to remain as it was, with cost-of-living increases. Schlesinger's plan to cut the fusion budget was dead.

=== Later upgrades ===
Work with the NBI beams continued, and eventually reached 2.5 MW to produce 75 million degrees, an event that was concluded with its own t-shirts.

Soon after, PLT began undergoing a series of changes to test new concepts. In 1981 it successfully created a current in the plasma using lower-hybrid radio-frequency waves, rather than using a transformer-induced current. Transformers were simple ways to induce a current, but had the disadvantage of being pulsed devices. For a production tokamak running for minutes at a time, some new system would be needed to keep the current running in the plasma. Lower-hybrid radio-frequency does this by sending radio signals into the plasma.

PLT also added ion-cyclotron radio-frequency heating, and in 1984 produced a 60 million degree plasma using this form of heating alone.

== Device details ==
Compared to earlier tokamaks, the PLT had a larger ratio of minor radius to major radius, which PPPL physicist Shoichi Yoshikawa worked out would be more efficient. This was later adopted worldwide.

- Major/minor radius (m) : 1.32 / 0.4 NB: Variable minor radius
- Toroidal field : 4 Tesla
- Poloidal field :
- Pulse duration :
- Plasma current : 700 kA
- Ion Cyclotron heating : 5 MW
- Neutral Beam Injection (NBI) : 3 MW
- Lower Hybrid Current Drive (LH) : 1 MW says "Largely a copy of the Russian T-10, but with addition of NBI and LH systems. Demonstrated current drive from breakdown by LH, but that LH only effective in low density plasmas. Variable minor radius by adjusting limiter position. The first machine to achieve a plasma current of 1MA. Metal limiters replaced by carbon limiters ... about 1978."
