= Wendelstein 7-X =

Modern stellarator for plasma fusion experiments

Coordinates: 54.073°N 13.424°E

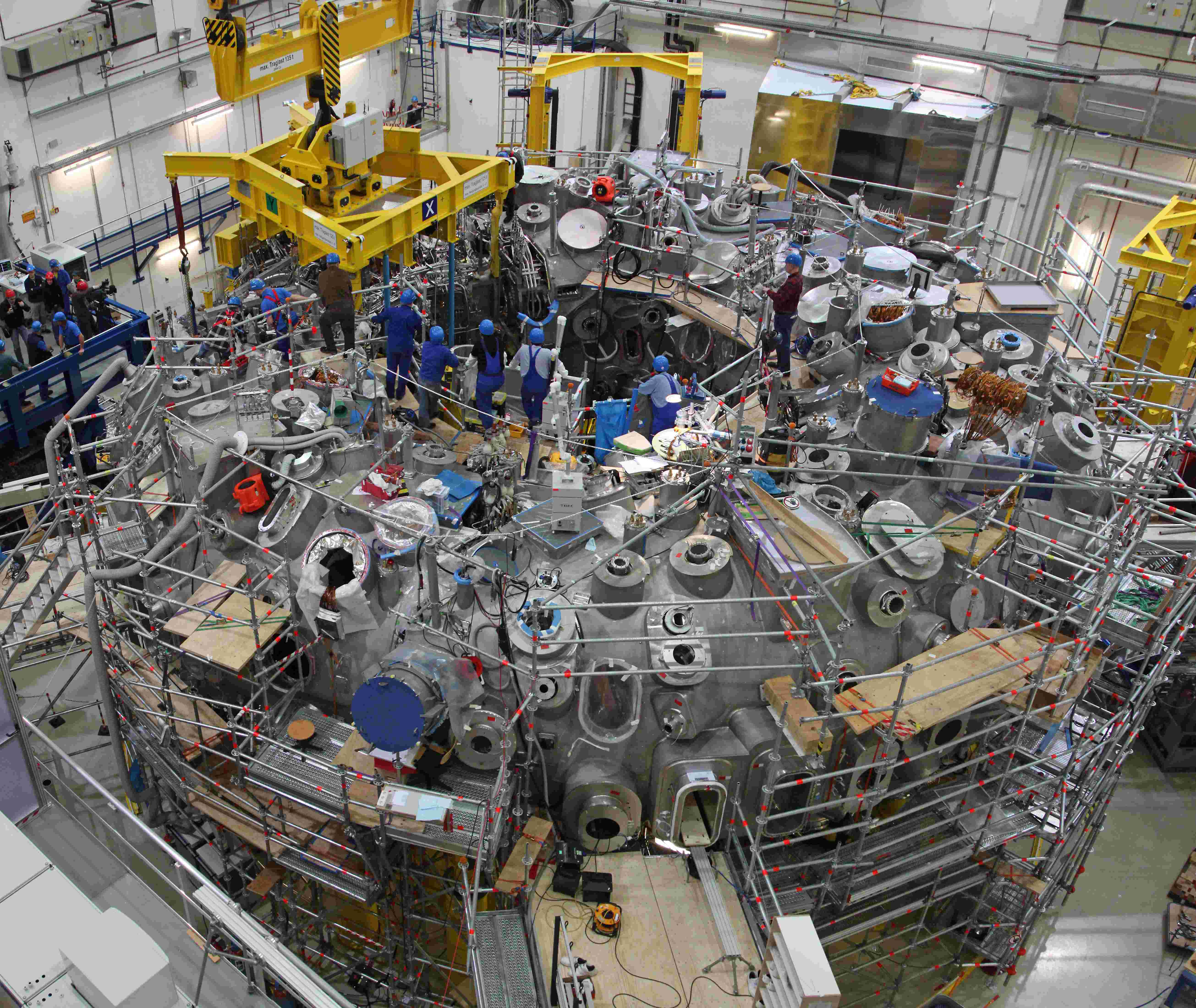
- W7-X in 2011
- Device type: Stellarator
- Location: Greifswald, Germany
- Affiliation: Max Planck Institute for Plasma Physics

Technical specifications
- Major radius: 5.5 m (18 ft)
- Minor radius: 0.53 m (1 ft 9 in)
- Plasma volume: 30 m^{3}
- Magnetic field: 2.5 T (25,000 G)
- Heating power: 14 MW
- Plasma current: 1 - 45 kA
- Plasma temperature: (6–13)×10^{7} K
- Plasma density: 1.8×10^{20} m^{−3}

History
- Year(s) of operation: 2015–present
- Preceded by: Wendelstein 7-AS

Links
- Website: www.ipp.mpg.de/w7x

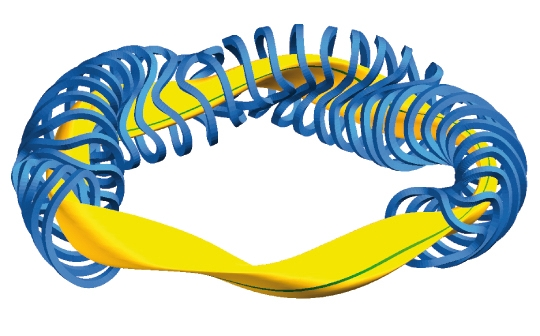
Stellarator schema - coil system (blue), plasma (yellow), a magnetic field line (green) on the plasma surface

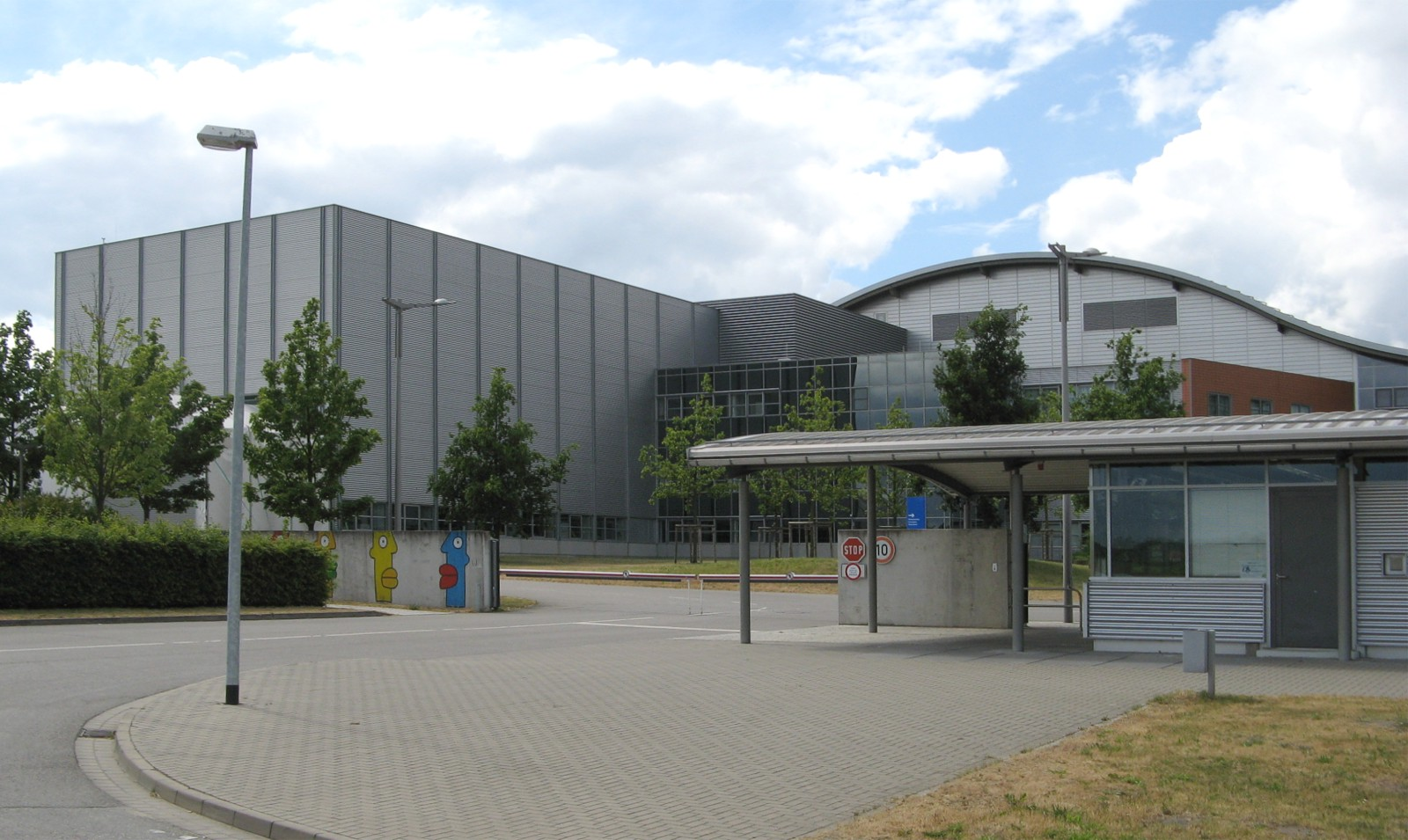
Wendelstein 7-X research complex in Greifswald, experiment hall on the left

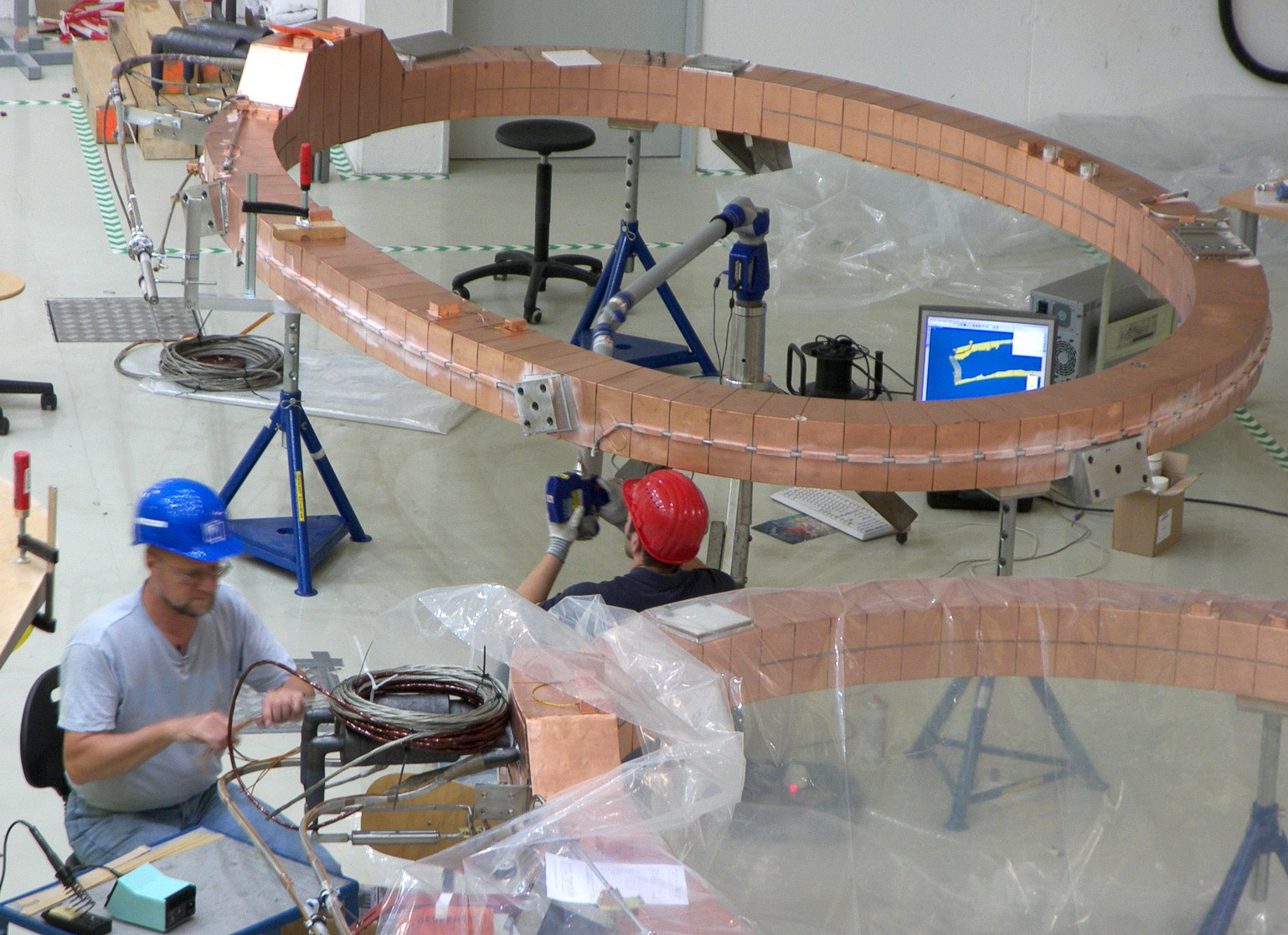
Superconducting feed lines being attached to the superconducting planar coils, 2008

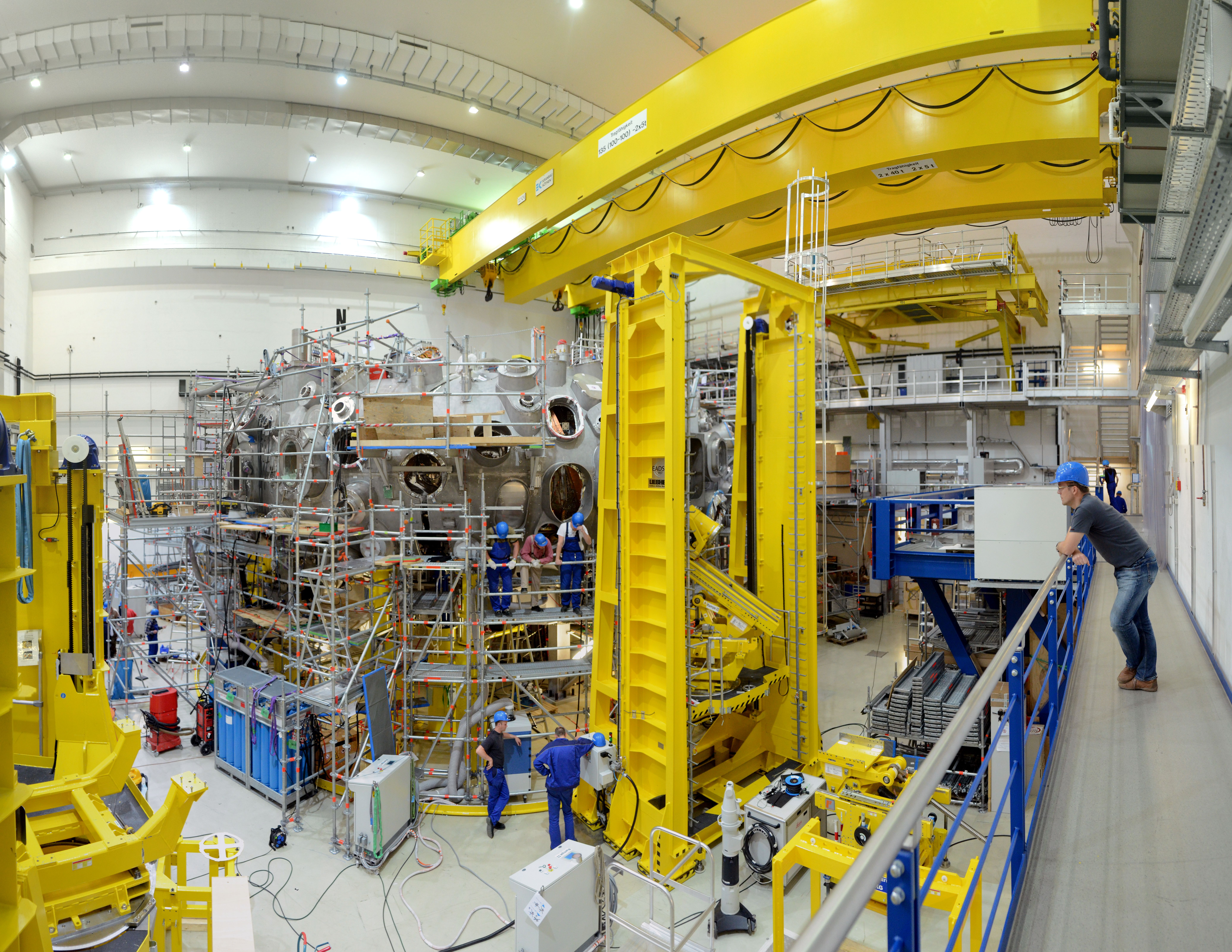
Construction in May 2012. Visible are the torus, offset in the test cell, and the large overhead crane. Note the workers for scale.

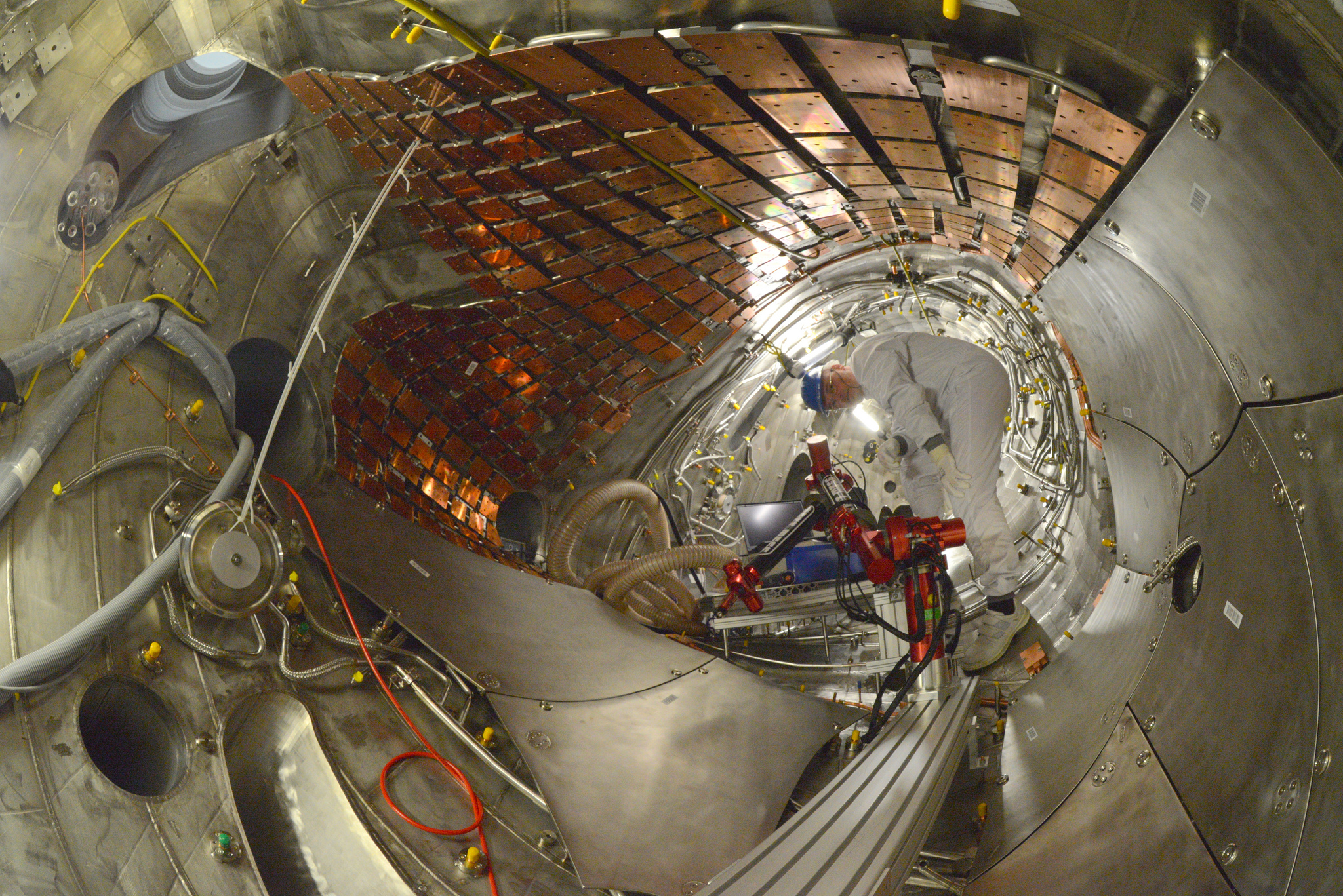
Wide-angle view inside the stellarator, showing the stainless cover plates and the water-cooled copper backing plates which will eventually be covered by graphite tiles and function as armor to protect against plasma/wall interactions

The Wendelstein 7-X (W7-X) reactor is an experimental stellarator built in Greifswald, Germany, by the Max Planck Institute for Plasma Physics (IPP), and completed in October 2015. Its purpose is to advance stellarator technology by evaluating the main components of a future fusion power plant. It was developed based on the predecessor Wendelstein 7-AS experimental reactor, which pioneered its modular coil technology but was significantly smaller and had a less advanced magnetic field optimization scheme. The research facility is an independent partner project of the Max Planck Institute for Plasma Physics with the University of Greifswald and EUROfusion.

Since the decommissioning of the equal-sized Large Helical Device in 2023, Wendelstein 7-X is the world's largest stellarator. After two successful operation phases ending in October 2018, the reactor was taken offline for upgrades. The upgrade was completed in 2022. New fusion experiments in February 2023 demonstrated longer confinement and increased power. The goal of this phase is to gradually increase power and duration for up to 30 minutes of continuous plasma discharge, thus demonstrating an essential feature of a future fusion power plant: continuous operation.

== Name ==
'Wendelstein' refers to the mountain in Bavaria. It originated as a 1950s reference to the first stellarator project, Matterhorn-S in the USA. The Matterhorn is a mountain in the Alps that the stellarator's inventor, Lyman Spitzer, liked to climb. The first Wendelstein stellarator was built in the 1960s and was contemporary with the Princeton Model C stellarator. Matternhorn-S later became Princeton Plasma Physics Laboratory.

== Design and main components ==
The Wendelstein 7-X device is based on a five-field-period Helias configuration. It is mainly a toroid, consisting of 50 non-planar and 20 planar superconducting magnetic coils, 3.5 m high, which induce a magnetic field that prevents the plasma from colliding with the reactor walls. The 50 non-planar coils are used for adjusting the magnetic field. It aims for a plasma density of 3×10^{20} particles per cubic metre, and a plasma temperature of 60–130 megakelvins (MK).

The W7-X is optimised along the quasi-isodynamic principle.

The main components are the magnetic coils, cryostat, plasma vessel, divertor and heating systems.

The coils (NbTi in aluminium) are arranged around a heat insulating cladding with a diameter of 16 metres, called the cryostat. A cooling device produces enough liquid helium to cool down the magnets and their enclosure (about 425 metric tons of "cold mass") to superconductivity temperature (4 K). The coils will carry 12.8 kA current and create a field of up to 3 teslas.

The plasma vessel, built of 20 parts, is on the inside adjusted to the complex shape of the magnetic field. It has 254 ports (holes) for plasma heating and observation diagnostics. The whole plant is built of five nearly identical modules, which were assembled in the experiment hall.

The heating system includes high power gyrotrons for electron cyclotron resonance heating (ECRH), which will deliver up to 15 MW of heating to the plasma. For operational phase 2 (OP-2), after completion of the full armor/water-cooling, up to 8 megawatts of neutral beam injection will also be available for 10 seconds. An ion cyclotron resonance heating (ICRH) system will become available for physics operation in OP1.2.

A system of sensors and probes based on a variety of complementary technologies will measure key properties of the plasma, including the profiles of the electron density and of the electron and ion temperature, as well as the profiles of important plasma impurities and of the radial electric field resulting from electron and ion particle transport.

== History ==
=== Construction ===
The German funding arrangement for the project was negotiated in 1994, establishing the Greifswald Branch Institute of the IPP in the north-eastern corner of the recently integrated East Germany. Its new building was completed in 2000. Construction of the stellarator was originally expected to reach completion in 2006. Assembly began in April 2005.

While being manufactured by a contractor, twenty of the fifty superconducting non-planar coils suffered manufacturing faults with their insulation, which took about 3 years to fix. Other problems included cracks in the steel coil case castings, and leaks in the supply lines for the superconductors' cooling helium. The faults did not directly relate to manufacturing tolerances or to the fact that the coils were shaped in the toroidal as well as the poloidal direction. The schedule slipped into late 2015.

The end of the construction phase, which required more than 1 million assembly hours, was officially marked by an inauguration ceremony on 20 May 2014. After a period of vessel leak-checking, beginning in the summer of 2014, the cryostat was evacuated, and magnet testing was completed in July 2015.

=== Operation, December 2015 - ===
The aim for operation phase 1 (OP 1.1), beginning 10 December 2015, was to conduct integrated testing of the most important systems as quickly as possible and to gain first experience with the physics of the machine. On that first day, the reactor successfully produced helium plasma (with temperatures of about 1 MK) for about 0.1s. For this initial test with about 1 mg of helium gas injected into the evacuated plasma vessel, microwave heating was applied for a short 1.3 MW pulse.

More than 300 discharges with helium were done in December and January with gradually increasing temperatures finally reaching six million degrees Celsius, to clean the vacuum vessel walls and test the plasma diagnostic systems. Then, on 3 February 2016, production of the first hydrogen plasma initiated the science program. The highest temperature plasmas were produced by four-megawatt microwave heater pulses lasting one second; plasma electron temperatures reached 100 MK, while ion temperatures reached 10 MK. More than 2,000 pulses were conducted before shutdown.

Five poloidal graphite limiters served as the main plasma-facing components during this first campaign (instead of the divertor modules). Experimental observations confirmed 3D modeling predictions that showed heat and particle flux deposition patterns on the limiters in clear correlation with the lengths of the open magnetic field lines in the plasma boundary.

Such tests were planned to continue for about a month, followed by a scheduled shut-down to open the vacuum vessel and line it with protective carbon tiles and install a "divertor" for removing impurities and heat from the plasma. The science program continued while gradually increasing discharge power and duration. The special magnetic field topology was confirmed in 2016.

Operational phase 1 (OP 1.1) concluded 10 March 2016 and an upgrade phase began.

Operational phase 1 continued (OP 1.2) in 2017 to test the (uncooled) divertor.

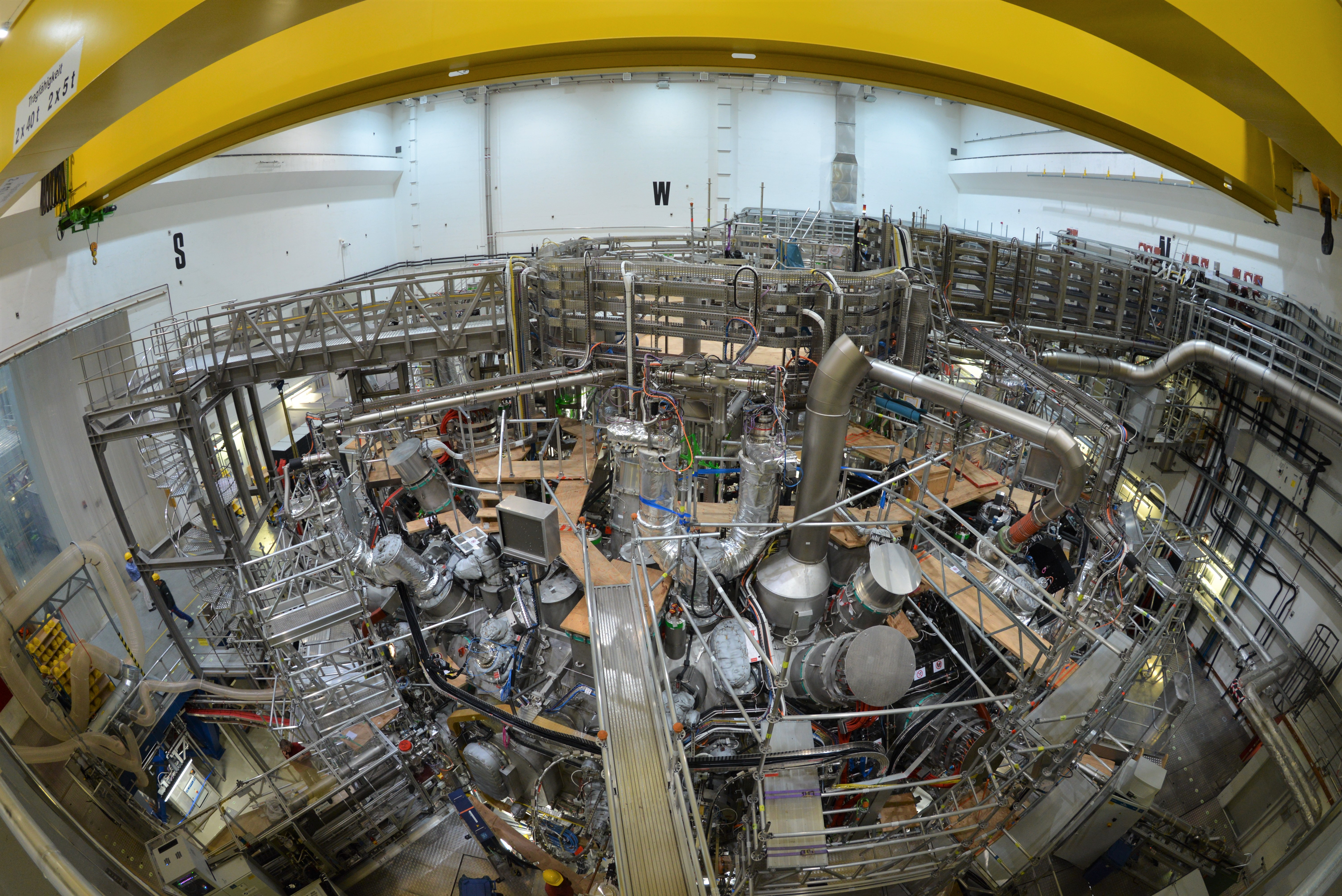
Wendelstein 7-X during OP1.2b

In June 2018 a record ion temperature of about 40 million degrees, a density of 0.8 × 10^{20} particles/m^{3}, and a confinement time of 0.2 second yielded a record fusion product of 6 × 10^{26} degree-seconds per cubic metre.

During the last experiments of 2018, the density reached 2 × 10^{20} particles/m^{3} at a temperature of 20 million degrees. With good plasma values, long-lasting plasmas with long discharge times of 100 seconds were obtained. Energy content exceeded 1 megajoule.

In 2021 an analysis of X-ray imaging crystal spectrometer data collected in the 2018 experiment substantially reduced troubling neoclassical transport heat loss. Collisions between heated particles cause some to escape the magnetic field. This was due to magnetic field cage optimization that was essential in achieving the record results.

In 2025 a fuel injector that combined continuous refueling with pulsed heating was tested. Over 43 seconds, 90 hydrogen pellets fired into the plasma at up to 800 metres (2,600 feet) per second heated it to a peak temperature of 30 million C. Energy turnover increased to 1.8 gigajoules over a six-minute run, exceeding the 1.3 gigajoules produced in February 2023. It exceeded the record achieved by the Experimental Advanced Superconducting Tokamak (EAST) in China in 2025.

=== Timeline ===
Date	Event
1980	Planning initiated
1994	Project initiated
2005	Assembly began
2014	Inaugurated
December 2015	Begin operational phase OP1.1
2015	Successful helium plasma test at 1 MK for ~0.1 s
2016	Hydrogen plasma at 80 MK for 0.25 s
March 2016	End OP1.1, begin upgrade phase
June 2017	Begin operational phase OP1.2
June 2018	Fusion triple product of 6 × 10^{26} degree-second/m^{3}
November 2018	End OP1.2, begin upgrade phase
August 2022	Final assembly step with water-coolers finished
February 2023	Start of OP2, demonstrated steady-state operation at higher power levels
September 2024	OP2.2: September 2024 – December 2024 increase plasma parameters
February 2025	OP2.3: February 2025 – May 2025 increase plasma parameters, world record triple product for long duration discharge
June 2025	Maintenance: June 2025 – August 2026
August 2026	OP2.4: August 2026 – December 2026
February 2027	OP2.5: February 2027 – May 2027

== Financing ==
Financial support for the project is about 80% from Germany and about 20% from the European Union. 90% of German funding comes from the federal government and 10% from the state government of Mecklenburg-Vorpommern. The total investment for the stellarator itself over 1997–2014 amounted to €370 million, while the total cost for the IPP site in Greifswald including investment plus operating costs (personnel and material resources) amounted to €1.06 billion for that 18-year period. This exceeded the original budget estimate, mainly because the initial development phase was longer than expected, doubling the personnel costs.

In July 2011, the President of the Max Planck Society, Peter Gruss, announced that the United States would contribute $7.5 million under the program "Innovative Approaches to Fusion" of the United States Department of Energy (PPPL, ORNL, and LANL). In 2012, Princeton University and the Max Planck Society announced a new joint research center in plasma physics, to include research on W7-X.

== Collaborating institutes ==
=== European Union ===
- FJFI at Czech Technical University in Prague (Czech Republic)
- Charles University (Czech Republic)
- Technische Universität Berlin (Germany)
- University of Greifswald (Germany)
- Forschungszentrum Jülich (Germany)
- Karlsruhe Institute of Technology (Germany)
- Institute of Interfacial Process Engineering and Plasma Technology (IGVP) at the University of Stuttgart (Germany)
- Physikalisch-Technische Bundesanstalt (Germany)
- Commissariat à l'énergie atomique et aux énergies alternatives (CEA; France)
- Centro de Investigaciones Energéticas, Medioambientales y Tecnológicas (CIEMAT; Spain)
- Institute of Nuclear Physics Kraków and National Centre for Nuclear Research (Poland)
- Institute of Plasma Physics and Laser Microfusion, Warsaw (Poland)
- KFKI Research Institute for Particle and Nuclear Physics of the Hungarian Academy of Sciences (Hungary)
- Trilateral Euregio Cluster (Germany/Belgium/Netherlands)
- Technical University of Denmark (DTU) (Denmark)
- Eindhoven University of Technology (The Netherlands)

=== United States ===
- Los Alamos National Laboratory
- Oak Ridge National Laboratory
- Princeton Plasma Physics Laboratory
- University of Wisconsin–Madison
- Massachusetts Institute of Technology
- Auburn University
- Xantho Technologies, LLC

=== Japan ===
- National Institute for Fusion Science

== See also ==
- Similar stellarators:
  - Large Helical Device, Japan, Heliotron, superconducting (1998–2025)
  - Helically Symmetric Experiment, USA, Quasi-Helically Symmetric
  - National Compact Stellarator Experiment, three field-period Helias configuration – had similar coil problems – construction halted in 2008
