= Model C stellarator =

American nuclear fusion reactor

- Device type: Stellarator
- Location: Princeton, New Jersey, United States
- Affiliation: Princeton Plasma Physics Laboratory

Technical specifications
- Major radius: 12.0 m (39.4 ft) (total non-circular length); 1.91 m (6 ft 3 in) (equivalent effective radius)
- Minor radius: 0.05–0.075 m (2.0 in – 3.0 in)
- Plasma volume: 0.1–0.2 m^{3}
- Magnetic field: 3.5 T (35,000 G)
- Heating power: 4 MW (RF)
- Plasma current: 0–8 kA
- Plasma temperature: 10–400 eV
- Plasma density: 4×10^{16} - 1×10^{20} m^{−3}

History
- Date(s) of construction: 1961
- Year(s) of operation: 1962–1969
- Preceded by: Model A/B stellarators
- Succeeded by: Symmetrical Tokamak (ST)

The Model C stellarator was the US flagship fusion experiment in the 1960s. The stellarator was invented by Lyman Spitzer at Princeton University in 1951. In 1961, Model C followed the smaller Model A and Model B stellarators at what became Princeton Plasma Physics Laboratory (PPPL).

Model C showed poor confinement of hot fuel plasma, notably suffering from Bohm diffusion. Its measured electron temperatures were only in the range of 10-400 eV, when ~10,000 was needed for a power plant. In 1968, the Soviet T-3 tokamak presented much better results at an international conference, verified by British scientists. Its confinement was twenty to thirty times better than predicted by Bohm diffusion, and reached temperatures of 1000 eV.

The following year, PPPL and the US Atomic Energy Commission decided to convert Model C to a tokamak, the Symmetrical Tokamak. Stellarator development in the US ended until 1984. At PPPL it did not resume until NCSX in the early 2000s, which was also unsuccessful.

== Design and concept ==
The Model C had a racetrack shape. The total length of its magnetic axis was 12 m, combining curved and straight sections. The plasma could have a 5-7.5 cm minor radius. Magnetic coils could produce a toroidal field (along the tube) of 50,000 Gauss, although it was more typically operated at 35,000 Gauss. It was only capable of pulsed operation.

It had a divertor in one of the straight sections. In the other it could inject 4 MW of 25 MHz ion cyclotron resonance heating (ICRH).

It had helical windings on the curved sections.

== Results ==
At the 1968 3rd IAEA Fusion Energy Conference in Novosibirsk, USSR, Model C reported results, for plasmas where particles were confined for more than one length of the machine, of 10 eV electron temperatures, and 4×10^{16} m^{−3} density. Confinement time was about five times longer than predicted by Bohm diffusion.

At the same conference, the West German Wendelstein II-A stellarator reported achieving confinement time one hundred times longer than predicted by Bohm diffusion, although its temperature and density were low due to its small size, weaker magnets, and use of Barium rather than hydrogen plasma.

Several months later, in its final paper before reconstruction as a tokamak, it was claimed that Model C achieved a peak average ion temperature of 400 eV in 1969.

== History ==
Construction funding/approval was announced in April 1957 with the design based on Katherine Weimer's efforts in fundamental research.

It started operating March 1962. The leader of Model C experiments was Princeton physicist Shoichi Yoshikawa.

The Model C was reconfigured as a tokamak in 1969, becoming the Symmetrical Tokamak (ST). Stellarator research ended in the USA, but continued in West Germany, Japan, the United Kingdom, and the Soviet Union itself.

== Related experiments ==
- Saturn-1, USSR
- CLASP, UK
- Wendelstein II-A, West Germany
