= T-3 tokamak =

Experimental tokamak

T-3
- "To Moscow": British scientists verify T-3's record-breaking claims, by Boris Kadomtsev.
- Device type: Tokamak
- Location: Moscow, Soviet Union
- Affiliation: Kurchatov Institute, Soviet Academy of Sciences

Technical specifications
- Major radius: 1.0 m (3 ft 3 in)
- Minor radius: 0.15 m (5.9 in)
- Magnetic field: 3.4 T (34,000 G)
- Plasma current: 0.08 MA
- Plasma temperature: 1 keV (12 MK)
- Plasma density: < 5×10^{19} m^{−3}

History
- Year(s) of operation: 1960–1970s?
- Succeeded by: T-4 tokamak

The T-3 tokamak was a tokamak fusion experiment built in the 1960s at the Kurchatov Institute in the Soviet Union. In 1968, it reported world record results for the temperature and density of its plasma at the 3rd IAEA international fusion energy conference.

As these were key quantities in achieving net power gain from fusion, it caused disbelief followed by excitement worldwide. At first, a British team from the Culham Centre for Fusion Energy was dispatched to Moscow to verify the results, which they concluded were accurate. This led to accelerated investment in tokamaks worldwide, including a complete pivot by the US from stellarator to tokamak.

In 1968, the tokamak was unique to the USSR. Most other countries focused on the Z-pinch and stellarator, particularly the UK and US respectively. After 1968, T-3 was followed in the US by the conversion of the Princeton Model C stellarator to the Symmetrical Tokamak in 1970. Both T-3 and the Symmetrical Tokamak confirmed that tokamaks could overcome Bohm diffusion by a large factor.

Building of the new PLT tokamak started in 1972. The PLT's own large successor was funded in 1975, TFTR. In Western Europe, design on the Euratom large tokamak JET began in the early 1970s, and it was funded in 1978. By 1980, the focus of attention and resources in fusion energy research worldwide was firmly on the tokamak.
