= List of fusion experiments =

List of efforts toward artificial nuclear fusion

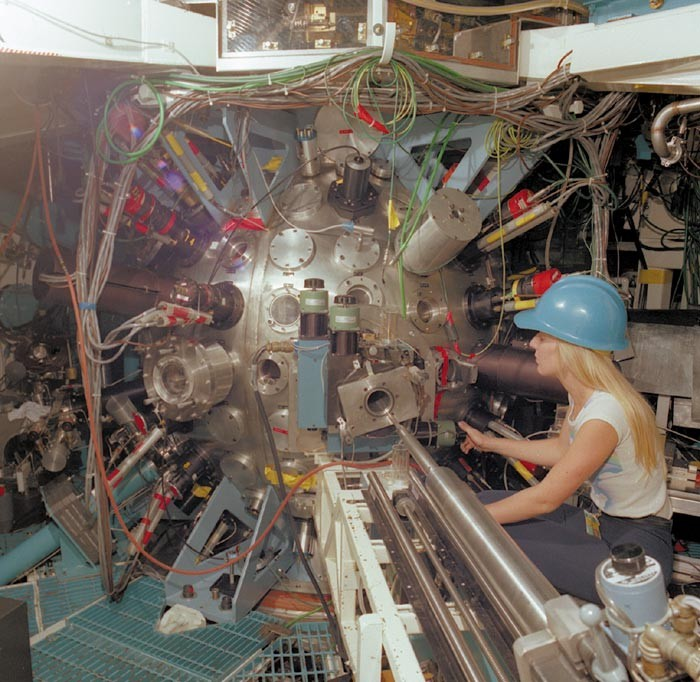
Target chamber of the Shiva laser, used for inertial confinement fusion experiments from 1978 until decommissioned in 1981

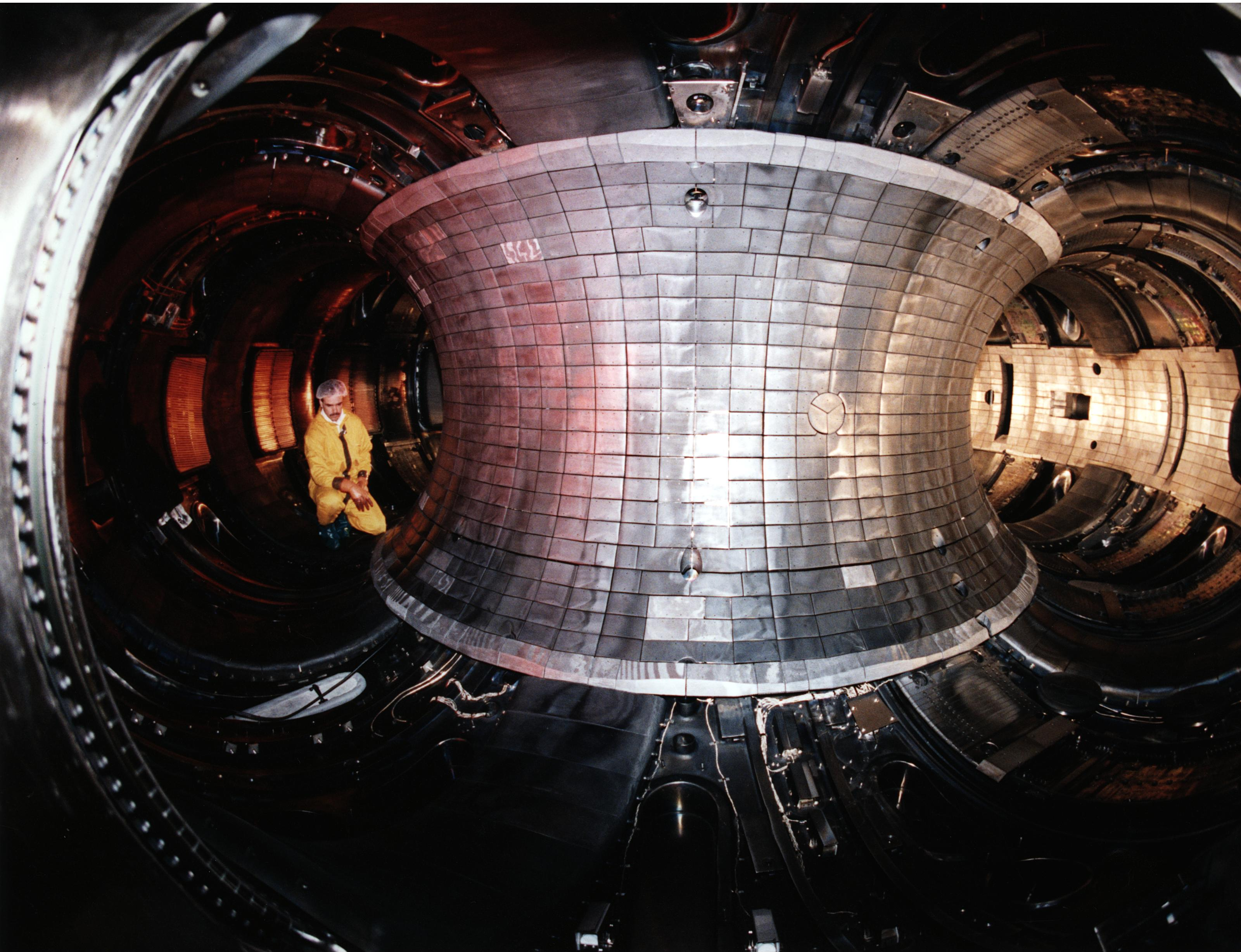
Plasma chamber of TFTR, used for magnetic confinement fusion experiments, which produced 11 MW of fusion power in 1994

Experiments directed toward developing fusion power are invariably done with dedicated machines which can be classified according to the principles they use to confine the plasma fuel and keep it hot.

The major division is between magnetic confinement and inertial confinement. In magnetic confinement, the tendency of the hot plasma to expand is counteracted by the Lorentz force between currents in the plasma and magnetic fields produced by external coils. The particle densities tend to be in the range of 10^{18} to 10^{22} m^{−3} and the linear dimensions in the range of 0.1 to 10 m. The particle and energy confinement times may range from under a millisecond to over a second, but the configuration itself is often maintained through input of particles, energy, and current for times that are hundreds or thousands of times longer. Some concepts are capable of maintaining a plasma indefinitely.

In contrast, with inertial confinement, there is nothing to counteract the expansion of the plasma. The confinement time is simply the time it takes the plasma pressure to overcome the inertia of the particles, hence the name. The densities tend to be in the range of 10^{31} to 10^{33} m^{−3} and the plasma radius in the range of 1 to 100 micrometers. These conditions are obtained by irradiating a millimeter-sized solid pellet with a nanosecond laser or ion pulse. The outer layer of the pellet is ablated, providing a reaction force that compresses the central 10% of the fuel by a factor of 10 or 20 to 10^{3} or 10^{4} times solid density. These microplasmas disperse in a time measured in nanoseconds. For a fusion power reactor, a repetition rate of several per second will be needed.

== Magnetic confinement experiments ==
Within the field of magnetic confinement experiments, there is a basic division between toroidal and open magnetic field topologies. Generally speaking, it is easier to contain a plasma in the direction perpendicular to the field than parallel to it. Parallel confinement can be solved either by bending the field lines back on themselves into circles or, more commonly, toroidal surfaces, or by constricting the bundle of field lines at both ends, which causes some of the particles to be reflected by the mirror effect. The toroidal geometries can be further subdivided according to whether the machine itself has a toroidal geometry, i.e., a solid core through the center of the plasma. The alternative is to dispense with a solid core and rely on currents in the plasma to produce the toroidal field.

Mirror machines have advantages in a simpler geometry and a better potential for direct conversion of particle energy to electricity. They generally require higher magnetic fields than toroidal machines, but the biggest problem has turned out to be confinement. For good confinement there must be more particles moving perpendicular to the field than there are moving parallel to the field. Such a non-Maxwellian velocity distribution is, however, very difficult to maintain and energetically costly.

The mirrors' advantage of simple machine geometry is maintained in machines which produce compact toroids, but there are potential disadvantages for stability in not having a central conductor and there is generally less possibility to control (and thereby optimize) the magnetic geometry. Compact toroid concepts are generally less well developed than those of toroidal machines. While this does not necessarily mean that they cannot work better than mainstream concepts, the uncertainty involved is much greater.

Somewhat in a class by itself is the Z-pinch, which has circular field lines. This was one of the first concepts tried, but it did not prove very successful. Furthermore, there was never a convincing concept for turning the pulsed machine requiring electrodes into a practical reactor.

The dense plasma focus is a controversial and "non-mainstream" device that relies on currents in the plasma to produce a toroid. It is a pulsed device that depends on a plasma that is not in equilibrium and has the potential for direct conversion of particle energy to electricity. Experiments are ongoing to test relatively new theories to determine if the device has a future.

=== Toroidal machine ===
Toroidal machines can be axially symmetric, like the tokamak and the reversed field pinch (RFP), or asymmetric, like the stellarator. The additional degree of freedom gained by giving up toroidal symmetry might ultimately be usable to produce better confinement, but the cost is complexity in the engineering, the theory, and the experimental diagnostics. Stellarators typically have a periodicity, e.g. a fivefold rotational symmetry. The RFP, despite some theoretical advantages such as a low magnetic field at the coils, has not proven very successful.

==== Tokamak ====
Device name	Status	Construction	Operation	Location	Organisation	Major/minor radius	B-field	Plasma current	Purpose	Image
T-1 (Tokamak-1)	Shut down	1957	1958–1959	(Soviet Union) Moscow	Kurchatov Institute	0.625 m/0.13 m	1 T	0.04 MA	First tokamak	T-1
T-2 (Tokamak-2)	Recycled →FT-1	1959	1960–1970	(Soviet Union) Moscow	Kurchatov Institute	0.62 m/0.22 m	1 T	0.04 MA		
T-3 (Tokamak-3)	Shut down	1960	1962–?	(Soviet Union) Moscow	Kurchatov Institute	1 m/0.12 m	3.5 T	0.15 MA	Overcame Bohm diffusion by a factor of 10, temperature 10 MK, confinement time 10 ms	
T-5 (Tokamak-5)	Shut down	?	1962–1970	(Soviet Union) Moscow	Kurchatov Institute	0.625 m/0.15 m	1.2 T	0.06 MA	Investigation of plasma equilibrium in vertical and horizontal direction	
TM-1	Shut down	?	?	(Soviet Union) Moscow	Kurchatov Institute					
TM-2	Shut down	?	1965	(Soviet Union) Moscow	Kurchatov Institute					
TM-3	Shut down	?	1970	(Soviet Union) Moscow	Kurchatov Institute					
FT-1	Recycled →CASTOR	T-2	1972–2002	(Soviet Union) Saint Petersburg	Ioffe Institute	0.62 m/0.22 m	1.2 T	0.05 MA		
ST (Symmetric Tokamak)	Shut down	Model C	1970–1974	(United States) Princeton	Princeton Plasma Physics Laboratory	1.09 m/0.13 m	5.0 T	0.13 MA	First American tokamak, converted from Model C stellarator	
T-6 (Tokamak-6)	Shut down	?	1970–1974	(Soviet Union) Moscow	Kurchatov Institute	0.7 m/0.25 m	1.5 T	0.22 MA		
TUMAN-2, 2A	Shut down	?	1971–1985	(Soviet Union) Saint Petersburg	Ioffe Institute	0.4 m/0.08 m	1.5 T	0.012 MA		
ORMAK (Oak Ridge tokaMAK)	Shut down		1971–1976	(United States) Oak Ridge	Oak Ridge National Laboratory	0.8 m/0.23 m	2.5 T	0.34 MA	First to achieve 20 MK plasma temperature	ORMAK plasma vessel
Doublet II	Shut down		1972–1974	(United States) San Diego	General Atomics	0.63 m/0.08 m	0.95 T	0.21 MA		
ATC (Adiabatic Toroidal Compressor)	Shut down	1971–1972	1972–1976	(United States) Princeton	Princeton Plasma Physics Laboratory	0.88 m/0.11 m	2 T	0.05 MA	Demonstrate compressional plasma heating	Schematic of ATC
T-9 (Tokamak-9)	Shut down	?	1972–1977	(Soviet Union) Moscow	Kurchatov Institute	0.36 m/0.07 m	1 T			
TO-1	Shut down	?	1972–1978	(Soviet Union) Moscow	Kurchatov Institute	0.6 m/0.13 m	1.5 T	0.07 MA		
Alcator A (Alto Campo Toro)	Shut down	?	1972–1978	(United States) Cambridge	Massachusetts Institute of Technology	0.54 m/0.10 m	9.0 T	0.3 MA		
JFT-2 (JAERI Fusion Torus 2)	Shut down	?	1972–1982	(Japan) Naka	Japan Atomic Energy Research Institute	0.9 m/0.25 m	1.8 T	0.25 MA		
Turbulent Tokamak Frascati (TTF, torello)	Shut down		1973	(Italy) Frascati	ENEA	0.3 m/0.04 m	1 T	0.005 MA	Study of turbulent plasma heating	
Pulsator	Shut down	1970–1973	1973–1979	(Germany) Garching	Max Planck Institute for Plasma Physics	0.7 m/0.12 m	2.7 T	0.125 MA	Discovery of high-density operation with tokamaks	
TFR (Tokamak de Fontenay-aux-Roses)	Shut down		1973–1984	(France) Fontenay-aux-Roses	CEA	0.98 m/0.2 m	6 T	0.49 MA		
T-4 (Tokamak-4)	Shut down	?	1974–1978	(Soviet Union) Moscow	Kurchatov Institute	0.9 m/0.16 m	5 T	0.3 MA	Observed fast thermal quench before major plasma disruptions	
Doublet IIA	Shut down		1974–1979	(United States) San Diego	General Atomics	0.66 m/0.15 m	0.76 T	0.35 MA		
Petula-B	Shut down	?	1974–1986	(France) Grenoble	CEA	0.72 m/0.18 m	2.7 T	0.23 MA		
T-10 (Tokamak-10)	Operational		1975–	(Soviet Union) Moscow	Kurchatov Institute	1.50 m/0.37 m	4 T	0.8 MA	Largest tokamak of its time	Model of the T-10
T-11 (Tokamak-11)	Shut down	?	1975–1984	(Soviet Union) Moscow	Kurchatov Institute	0.7 m/0.25 m	1 T			
PLT (Princeton Large Torus)	Shut down	1972–1975	1975–1986	(United States) Princeton	Princeton Plasma Physics Laboratory	1.32 m/0.42 m	4 T	0.7 MA	First to achieve 1 MA plasma current	Construction of the Princeton Large Torus
Divertor Injection Tokamak Experiment (DITE)	Shut down		1975–1989	(United Kingdom) Culham	United Kingdom Atomic Energy Authority	1.17 m/0.27 m	2.7 T	0.26 MA		
JIPP T-II	Shut down	?	1976	(Japan) Nagoya	Nagoya University	0.91 m/0.17 m	3 T	0.16 MA		
TNT-A	Shut down	?	1976	(Japan) Tokyo	Tokyo University	0.4 m/0.09 m	0.42 T	0.02 MA		
T-8 (Tokamak-8)	Shut down	?	1976–?	(Soviet Union) Moscow	Kurchatov Institute	0.28 m/0.048 m	0.9 T	0.024 MA	First D-shaped tokamak	
Microtor	Shut down	?	1976–1983?	(United States) Los Angeles	UCLA	0.3 m/0.1 m	2.5 T	0.12 MA	Plasma impurity control and diagnostic development	
Macrotor	Shut down	?	1970s–80s	(United States) Los Angeles	UCLA	0.9 m/0.4 m	0.4 T	0.1 MA	Understanding plasma rotation driven by radial current	
TUMAN-3	Operational	?	1977– (1990–, 3M)	(Soviet Union) Saint Petersburg	Ioffe Institute	0.55 m/0.23 m	3 T	0.18 MA	Study adiabatic compression, RF and NB heating, H-mode and parametric instability	
Thor	Shut down		?	(Italy) Milano	University of Milano	0.52 m/0.195 m	1 T	0.055 MA		
FT (Frascati Tokamak)	Shut down		1978	(Italy) Frascati	ENEA	0.83 m/0.20 m	10 T	0.8 MA		
PDX (Poloidal Divertor Experiment)	Shut down	?	1978–1983	(United States) Princeton	Princeton Plasma Physics Laboratory	1.4 m/0.4 m	2.4 T	0.5 MA		
ISX-B	Shut down	?	1978–1984	(United States) Oak Ridge	Oak Ridge National Laboratory	0.93 m/0.27 m	1.8 T	0.2 MA	Attempt high-beta operation	
Doublet III	Shut down		1978–1985	(United States) San Diego	General Atomics	1.45 m/0.45 m	2.6 T	0.61 MA		
T-12 (Tokamak-12)	Shut down	?	1978–1985	(Soviet Union) Moscow	Kurchatov Institute	0.36 m/0.08 m	1 T	0.03 MA		
Alcator C (Alto Campo Toro)	Shut down	?	1978–1986	(United States) Cambridge	Massachusetts Institute of Technology	0.64 m/0.16 m	13 T	0.8 MA		
T-7 (Tokamak-7)	Recycled →HT-7	?	1979–1985	(Soviet Union) Moscow	Kurchatov Institute	1.2 m/0.31 m	3 T	0.3 MA	First tokamak with superconducting toroidal field coils	
ASDEX (Axially Symmetric Divertor Experiment)	Recycled →HL-2A	1973–1980	1980–1990	(Germany) Garching	Max-Planck-Institut für Plasmaphysik	1.65 m/0.4 m	2.8 T	0.5 MA	Discovery of the H-mode in 1982	
FT-2	Operational	?	1980–	(Soviet Union) Saint Petersburg	Ioffe Institute	0.55 m/0.08 m	3 T	0.05 MA	H-mode physics, LH heating	
TEXTOR (Tokamak Experiment for Technology Oriented Research)	Shut down	1976–1980	1981–2013	(Germany) Jülich	Forschungszentrum Jülich	1.75 m/0.47 m	2.8 T	0.8 MA	Study plasma-wall interactions	
TFTR (Tokamak Fusion Test Reactor)	Shut down	1980–1982	1982–1997	(United States) Princeton	Princeton Plasma Physics Laboratory	2.4 m/0.8 m	5.9 T	3 MA	Attempted scientific break-even, reached record fusion power of 10.7 MW and temperature of 510 MK	TFTR plasma vessel
Tokamak de Varennes (TdeV)	Shut down	?	1983–1997	(Canada) Montreal	National Research Council Canada	0.83 m/0.27 m	1.5 T	0.3 MA		
JFT-2M (JAERI Fusion Torus 2M)	Shut down	?	1983–2004	(Japan) Naka	Japan Atomic Energy Research Institute	1.3 m/0.35 m	2.2 T	0.5 MA		
JET (Joint European Torus)	Shut down	1978–1983	1983–2023	(United Kingdom) Culham	United Kingdom Atomic Energy Authority	2.96 m/0.96 m	4 T	7 MA	Records for fusion output power 16.1 MW (1997), fusion energy 69 MJ (2023)	JET in 1991
Novillo	Shut down	NOVA-II	1983–2004	Mexico City	es:Instituto Nacional de Investigaciones Nucleares	0.23 m/0.06 m	1 T	0.01 MA	Study plasma-wall interactions	
JT-60 (Japan Torus-60)	Recycled →JT-60U		1985–1989	(Japan) Naka	Japan Atomic Energy Research Institute	3 m/0.95 m	4 T	2.6 MA	High-beta steady-state operation, highest fusion triple product	JT-60 vacuum vessel
CCT (Continuous Current Tokamak)	Shut down	?	1986–199?	(United States) Los Angeles	UCLA	1.5 m/0.4 m	0.2 T	0.05 MA	H-mode studies	
DIII-D	Operational	1986	1986–	(United States) San Diego	General Atomics	1.67 m/0.67 m	2.2 T	3 MA	Tokamak Optimization	DIII-D vacuum vessel
STOR-M (Saskatchewan Torus-Modified)	Operational		1987–	(Canada) Saskatoon	Plasma Physics Laboratory (Saskatchewan)	0.46 m/0.125 m	1 T	0.06 MA	Study plasma heating and anomalous transport	
T-15	Recycled →T-15MD	1983–1988	1988–1995	(Soviet Union) Moscow	Kurchatov Institute	2.43 m/0.78 m	3.6 T	1 MA	First superconducting tokamak, pulse duration 1.5 s	T-15 on a stamp
Tore Supra	Recycled →WEST		1988–2011	(France) Cadarache	Département de Recherches sur la Fusion Contrôlée	2.25 m/0.7 m	4.5 T	2 MA	Large superconducting tokamak with active cooling	
ADITYA (tokamak)	Operational		1989–	(India) Gandhinagar	Institute for Plasma Research	0.75 m/0.25 m	1.2 T	0.25 MA		
COMPASS (COMPact ASSembly)	Operational	1980–	1989–	(Czech Republic) Prague	Institute of Plasma Physics, Czech Academy of Sciences	0.56 m/0.23 m	2.1 T	0.32 MA	Plasma physics studies for ITER	COMPASS plasma chamber
FTU (Frascati Tokamak Upgrade)	Operational		1990–	(Italy) Frascati	ENEA	0.935 m/0.35 m	8 T	1.6 MA		
START (Small Tight Aspect Ratio Tokamak)	Recycled →Proto-Sphera		1990–1998	(United Kingdom) Culham	United Kingdom Atomic Energy Authority	0.3 m/?	0.5 T	0.31 MA	First full-sized Spherical Tokamak	
JT-60U (Japan Torus-60 Upgrade)	Shut down	1989–1991	1991–2008	(Japan) Naka	Japan Atomic Energy Research Institute	3.4 m/1.0 m	4 T	3 MA	investigate energy confinement near the breakeven condition	
ASDEX Upgrade (Axially Symmetric Divertor Experiment)	Operational		1991–	(Germany) Garching	Max-Planck-Institut für Plasmaphysik	1.65 m/0.5 m	2.6 T	1.4 MA		ASDEX Upgrade plasma vessel segment
Alcator C-Mod (Alto Campo Toro)	Shut down	1986–	1991–2016	(United States) Cambridge	Massachusetts Institute of Technology	0.68 m/0.22 m	8 T	2 MA	Record plasma pressure 2.05 bar	Alcator C-Mod plasma vessel
ISTTOK (Instituto Superior Técnico TOKamak)	Operational	1974 (Tortur I/Netherland)	1992–	(Portugal) Lisbon	Instituto de Plasmas e Fusão Nuclear	0.46 m/0.085 m	2.8 T	0.01 MA	Multi-cycle long-lasting alternating plasma current operation	ISTTOK Tokamak, Instituto Superior Técnico, Lisbon
TCV (Tokamak à Configuration Variable)	Operational		1992–	(Switzerland) Lausanne	École Polytechnique Fédérale de Lausanne	0.88 m/0.25 m	1.43 T	1.2 MA	Confinement studies	TCV plasma vessel
MEDUSA (Madison EDUcational Small–Aspect–ratio)	Recycled → MEDUSA–CR	1992–1994	1994–1999	(United States) Madison	University of Wisconsin–Madison	0.09 m-0.14 m/ 0.04 m-0.10 m	0.3 T (0.5 T max)	0.02 MA (0.04 MA max)	Test-bed for and lead-in to the Pegasus ultra-low-aspect-ratio toroidal experiment	
HBT-EP (High Beta Tokamak-Extended Pulse)	Operational		1993–	(United States) New York City	Columbia University Plasma Physics Laboratory	0.92 m/0.15 m	0.35 T	0.03 MA	High-Beta tokamak	HBT-EP sketch
HT-7 (Hefei Tokamak-7)	Shut down	1991–1994 (T-7)	1995–2013	(China) Hefei	Hefei Institutes of Physical Science	1.22 m/0.27 m	2 T	0.2 MA	China's first superconducting tokamak	
Pegasus Toroidal Experiment	Operational	?	1996–	(United States) Madison	University of Wisconsin–Madison	0.45 m/0.4 m	0.18 T	0.3 MA	Extremely low aspect ratio	Pegasus Toroidal Experiment
NSTX (National Spherical Torus Experiment)	Operational		1999–	(United States) Plainsboro Township	Princeton Plasma Physics Laboratory	0.85 m/0.68 m	0.3 T	2 MA	Study the spherical tokamak concept	National Spherical Torus Experiment
Globus-M (UNU Globus-M)	Operational		1999–	(Russia) Saint Petersburg	Ioffe Institute	0.36 m/0.24 m	0.4 T	0.3 MA	Study the spherical tokamak concept	
ET (Electric Tokamak)	Recycled →ETPD	1998	1999–2006	(United States) Los Angeles	UCLA	5 m/1 m	0.25 T	0.045 MA	Largest tokamak of its time	
TCABR (Tokamak Chauffage Alfvén Brésilien)	Operational	1980–1999	1999–	(Switzerland) Lausanne, (Brazil) Sao Paulo	University of Sao Paulo	0.615 m / 0.18 m	1.1 T	0.10 MA	Most important tokamak in the southern hemisphere	
CDX-U (Current Drive Experiment-Upgrade)	Recycled →LTX		2000–2005	(United States) Princeton	Princeton Plasma Physics Laboratory	0.3 m/?	0.23 T	0.03 MA	Study Lithium in plasma walls	CDX-U setup
MAST (Mega-Ampere Spherical Tokamak)	Recycled →MAST-Upgrade	1997–1999	2000–2013	(United Kingdom) Culham	United Kingdom Atomic Energy Authority	0.85 m/0.65 m	0.55 T	1.35 MA	Investigate spherical tokamak for fusion	Plasma in MAST
HL-2A (Huan-Liuqi-2A)	Operational	2000–2002	2002–2018	(China) Chengdu	Southwestern Institute of Physics	1.65 m/0.4 m	2.7 T	0.43 MA	H-mode physics, ELM mitigation	
SST-1 (Steady State Superconducting Tokamak)	Operational	2001–	2005–	(India) Gandhinagar	Institute for Plasma Research	1.1 m/0.2 m	3 T	0.22 MA	Produce a 1000 s elongated double null divertor plasma	
EAST (Experimental Advanced Superconducting Tokamak)	Operational	2000–2005	2006–	(China) Hefei	Hefei Institutes of Physical Science	1.85 m/0.43 m	3.5 T	0.5 MA	Superheated plasma for over 1066 s and 20 s at 160 M°C	Drawing of EAST
J-TEXT (Joint TEXT)	Operational	TEXT (Texas EXperimental Tokamak)	2007–	(China) Wuhan	Huazhong University of Science and Technology	1.05 m/0.26 m	2.0 T	0.2 MA	Develop plasma control	
KSTAR (Korea Superconducting Tokamak Advanced Research)	Operational	1998–2007	2008–	(South Korea) Daejeon	National Fusion Research Institute	1.8 m/0.5 m	3.5 T	2 MA	Tokamak with fully superconducting magnets, 48 s-long operation at 100 MK	KSTAR
LTX (Lithium Tokamak Experiment)	Operational	2005–2008	2008–	(United States) Princeton	Princeton Plasma Physics Laboratory	0.4 m/?	0.4 T	0.4 MA	Study Lithium in plasma walls	Lithium Tokamak Experiment plasma vessel
QUEST (Q-shu University Experiment with Steady-State Spherical Tokamak)	Operational		2008–	(Japan) Kasuga	Kyushu University	0.68 m/0.4 m	0.25 T	0.02 MA	Study steady state operation of a Spherical Tokamak	QUEST
Kazakhstan Tokamak for Material testing (KTM)	Operational	2000–2010	2010–	(Kazakhstan) Kurchatov	National Nuclear Center of the Republic of Kazakhstan	0.86 m/0.43 m	1 T	0.75 MA	Testing of wall and divertor	
ST25-HTS	Operational	2012–2015	2015–	(United Kingdom) Culham	Tokamak Energy Ltd	0.25 m/0.125 m	0.1 T	0.02 MA	Steady state plasma	ST25-HTS with plasma
WEST (Tungsten Environment in Steady-state Tokamak)	Operational	2013–2016	2016–	(France) Cadarache	Département de Recherches sur la Fusion Contrôlée	2.5 m/0.5 m	3.7 T	1 MA	Superconducting tokamak with active cooling	WEST chamber
ST40	Operational	2017–2018	2018–	(United Kingdom) Didcot	Tokamak Energy Ltd	0.4 m/0.3 m	3 T	2 MA	First high field spherical tokamak, reached 100 MK plasma	ST40 engineering drawing
MAST-U (Mega-Ampere Spherical Tokamak Upgrade)	Operational	2013–2019	2020–	(United Kingdom) Culham	United Kingdom Atomic Energy Authority	0.85 m/0.65 m	0.92 T	2 MA	Test new exhaust concepts for a spherical tokamak	
HL-3 / HL-2M (Huan-Liuqi-2M)	Operational	2018–2019	2020–	(China) Leshan	Southwestern Institute of Physics	1.78 m/0.65 m	2.2 T	1.2 MA	Elongated plasma with 200 MK	HL-2M
JT-60SA (Japan Torus-60 super, advanced)	Operational	2013–2020	2021–	(Japan) Naka	Japan Atomic Energy Research Institute	2.96 m/1.18 m	2.25 T	5.5 MA	Optimise plasma configurations for ITER and DEMO with full non-inductive steady-state operation	JT-60SA
T-15MD	Operational	2010–2020	2021–	(Russia) Moscow	Kurchatov Institute	1.48 m/0.67 m	2 T	2 MA	Hybrid fusion/fission reactor	T-15MD coil system
IGNITOR	Cancelled 2022	-	-	(Russia) Troitzk	ENEA	1.32 m/0.47 m	13 T	11 MA	Compact fusion reactor with self-sustained plasma and 100 MW of planned fusion power	
HH70 (HongHuang 70)	Operational	2022–2024	2024–	(China) Shanghai	Energy Singularity	0.75 m/0.31 m	2.5 T		REBCO High-temperature superconducting coils	
SPARC	Under construction	2021–	2026?	(United States) Devens, MA	Commonwealth Fusion Systems and MIT Plasma Science and Fusion Center	1.85 m/0.57 m	12.2 T	8.7 MA	Compact, high-field tokamak with ReBCO coils and 100 MW planned fusion power	Artist's impression of SPARC
ITER	Under construction	2013–2034?	2034?	(France) Cadarache	ITER Council	6.2 m/2.0 m	5.3 T	15 MA ?	Demonstrate feasibility of fusion on a power-plant scale with 500 MW fusion power	Small-scale model of ITER
Burning Plasma Experimental Superconducting Tokamak (BEST)	Under construction	2023–2027?	2027?	(China) Hefei	Institute of Energy, Hefei Comprehensive National Science Center	3.6 m/1.1 m	6.15 T ?	7 MA ?	Intermediate step between EAST and CFETR	
Snowdon	Under construction	2025-	2028	(United Kingdom) Stafford	Stafford Fusion Lab	0.165 m/0.13 m	0.5 T ?	0.04 MA ?	Investigate Low aspect ratio startup conditions	
DTT (Divertor Tokamak Test facility)	Planned	2022–2029?	2029?	(Italy) Frascati	ENEA	2.19 m/0.70 m	5.85 T ?	5.5 MA ?	Superconducting tokamak to study power exhaust	
SST-2 (Steady State Tokamak-2)	Planned		2027?	(India) Gujarat	Institute for Plasma Research	4.42 m/1.47 m	5.42 T	11.2 MA	Full-fledged fusion reactor with tritium breeding and up to 500 MW output	
CFETR (China Fusion Engineering Test Reactor)	Planned	≥2024	2030?	(China)	Institute of Plasma Physics, Chinese Academy of Sciences	7.2 m/2.2 m ?	6.5 T ?	14 MA ?	Bridge gaps between ITER and DEMO, planned fusion power 1000 MW	
ST-F1 (Spherical Tokamak - Fusion 1)	Planned	2027?		(United Kingdom) Didcot	Tokamak Energy Ltd	1.4 m/0.8 m ?	4 T	5 MA	Spherical tokamak with Q=3 and hundreds of MW planned electrical output (no longer mentioned by company as of 2024)	
STX (ST80-HTS)	Planned	2026?	2030?	(United Kingdom) Culham	Tokamak Energy Ltd				Spherical tokamak capable of 15min-pulsed operation	
ST-E1	Planned	2030s?		(United Kingdom) Culham	Tokamak Energy Ltd				Spherical tokamak with 200 MW planned net electric output	
STEP (Spherical Tokamak for Energy Production)	Planned	2032-2040	2040 D-D; Mid 2040s DT Campaign	(United Kingdom) West Burton, Nottinghamshire	United Kingdom Atomic Energy Authority	3 m/2 m ?	?	16.5 MA ?	Spherical tokamak with 100 MW planned electrical output	
JA-DEMO	Planned	2030?	2050?	(Japan)	?	8.5 m/2.4 m	5.94 T	12.3 MA	Prototype for development of Commercial Fusion Reactors 1.5–2 GW Fusion output.	
K-DEMO (Korean fusion demonstration tokamak reactor)	Planned	2037?		(South Korea)	National Fusion Research Institute	6.8 m/2.1 m	7 T	12 MA ?	Prototype for the development of commercial fusion reactors with around 2200 MW of fusion power	Engineering drawing of planned KDEMO
DEMO (DEMOnstration Power Station)	Planned	2040?	2050?	?		9 m/3 m ?	6 T ?	20 MA ?	Prototype for a commercial fusion reactor	Artist's conception of DEMO

==== Stellarator ====
Device name	Status	Construction	Operation	Type	Location	Organisation	Major/minor radius	B-field	Purpose	Image
Model A	Shut down	1952–1953	1953–?	Figure-8	(United States) Princeton	Princeton Plasma Physics Laboratory	0.3 m/0.02 m	0.1 T	First stellarator, table-top device	
Model B	Shut down	1953–1954	1954–1959	Figure-8	(United States) Princeton	Princeton Plasma Physics Laboratory	0.3 m/0.02 m	5 T	Development of plasma diagnostics	
Model B-1	Shut down		?–1959	Figure-8	(United States) Princeton	Princeton Plasma Physics Laboratory	0.25 m/0.02 m	5 T	Yielded 1 MK plasma temperatures, showed cooling by X-ray radiation from impurities	
Model B-2	Shut down		1957	Figure-8	(United States) Princeton	Princeton Plasma Physics Laboratory	0.3 m/0.02 m	5 T	Electron temperatures up to 10 MK	
Model B-3	Shut down	1957	1958–	Figure-8	(United States) Princeton	Princeton Plasma Physics Laboratory	0.4 m/0.02 m	4 T	Last figure-8 device, confinement studies of ohmically heated plasma	
Model B-64	Shut down	1955	1955	Square	(United States) Princeton	Princeton Plasma Physics Laboratory	0.5 m/0.05 m	1.8 T		
Model B-65	Shut down	1957	1957–1960	Racetrack	(United States) Princeton	Princeton Plasma Physics Laboratory	0.5 m/0.05 m	3 T	First use of toroidal-field divertor; demonstrated RF heating	
Model B-66	Shut down	1958	1958–1961	Racetrack	(United States) Princeton	Princeton Plasma Physics Laboratory	0.6 m/0.075 m	4 T	Showed large pump-out losses	
Wendelstein 1-A	Shut down		1960	Racetrack	(Germany) Garching	Max-Planck-Institut für Plasmaphysik	0.35 m/0.02 m	2 T	ℓ=3 showed that stellarators can overcome Bohm diffusion, "Munich mystery"	
Wendelstein 1-B	Shut down		1960	Racetrack	(Germany) Garching	Max-Planck-Institut für Plasmaphysik	0.35 m/0.02 m	2 T	ℓ=2	
Model C	Recycled →ST	1957–1961	1961–1969	Racetrack	(United States) Princeton	Princeton Plasma Physics Laboratory	1.9 m/0.07 m	3.5 T	Suffered from large plasma losses by Bohm diffusion through "pump-out"	
L-1	Shut down	1963	1963–1971	round	(Soviet Union) Moscow	Lebedev Physical Institute	0.6 m/0.05 m	1 T	First Soviet stellarator, overcame Bohm diffusion	
SIRIUS	Shut down	1955–1959	1964–1975?	Racetrack	(Soviet Union) Kharkiv	Kharkiv Institute of Physics and Technology (KIPT)	0.7 m/0.1 m	3 T	Investigate plasma confinement with helical coil geometry	
TOR-1	Shut down	1967	1967–1973		(Soviet Union) Moscow	Lebedev Physical Institute	0.6 m/0.05 m	1 T		
TOR-2	Shut down	?	1967–1973		(Soviet Union) Moscow	Lebedev Physical Institute	0.63 m/0.036 m	2.5 T		
Uragan-1	Shut down	1960–1967	1967–?	Racetrack	(Soviet Union) Kharkiv	National Science Center, Kharkiv Institute of Physics and Technology (NSC KIPT)	1.1 m/0.1 m	1 T	Overcame Bohm-diffusion by a factor of 30	
CLASP (Closed Line And Single Particle)	Shut down	?	1967–?		(United Kingdom) Culham	United Kingdom Atomic Energy Authority	0.3 m/0.056 m	0.1 T	Study confinement of electrons in a high-shear stellarator	
TWIST	Shut down	?	1967–?		(United Kingdom) Culham	United Kingdom Atomic Energy Authority	0.32 m/0.045 m	0.3 T	Study turbulent heating	
Proto-CLEO	Shut down	?	1968–?	single-turn helical winding inside toroidal field conductors	(United Kingdom) Culham, (United States) Madison	United Kingdom Atomic Energy Authority	0.4 m/0.05 m	0.5 T	confirmed plasma confinement times of neoclassical theory	
TORSO	Shut down	?	1972–?	Ultimate torsatron	(United Kingdom) Culham	United Kingdom Atomic Energy Authority	0.4 m/0.05 m	2 T		
CLEO	Shut down	?	1974–?		(United Kingdom) Culham	United Kingdom Atomic Energy Authority	0.9 m/0.125 m	2 T	Study of particle transport and beta limits, reached similar performance as tokamaks	
Wendelstein II-A	Shut down	1965–1968	1968–1974	Heliotron	(Germany) Garching	Max-Planck-Institut für Plasmaphysik	0.5 m/0.05 m	0.6 T	Good plasma confinement	Wendelstein 2-A
Saturn-1	Shut down	1970	1970–?	Torsatron	(Soviet Union) Kharkiv	Kharkiv Institute of Physics and Technology	0.36 m/0.08 m	1 T	first Torsatron, ℓ=3, m=8 field periods, base for several torsatrons at KIPT	
Wendelstein II-B	Shut down	?–1970	1971–?	Heliotron	(Germany) Garching	Max-Planck-Institut für Plasmaphysik	0.5 m/0.055 m	1.25 T	Demonstrated similar performance as tokamaks	Wendelstein 2-B
Vint-20	Shut down	1972	1973–?	Torsatron	(Soviet Union) Kharkiv	Kharkiv Institute of Physics and Technology	0.315 m/0.0725 m	1.8 T	single-pole ℓ=1, m=13 field periods	
L-2	Shut down	?	1975–?		(Soviet Union) Moscow	Lebedev Physical Institute	1 m/0.11 m	2.0 T		
WEGA (Wendelstein Experiment in Greifswald für die Ausbildung)	Recycled →HIDRA	1972–1975	1975–2013	Classical stellarator	(Germany) Greifswald	Max-Planck-Institut für Plasmaphysik	0.72 m/0.15 m	1.4 T	Test lower hybrid heating	WEGA
Wendelstein 7-A	Shut down	?	1975–1985	Classical stellarator	(Germany) Garching	Max-Planck-Institut für Plasmaphysik	2 m/0.1 m	3.5 T	First "pure" stellarator without plasma current, solved stellarator heating problem	
Heliotron-E	Shut down	?	1980–?	Heliotron	(Japan)		2.2 m/0.2 m	1.9 T		
Heliotron-DR	Shut down	?	1981–?	Heliotron	(Japan)		0.9 m/0.07 m	0.6 T		
Uragan-3 (M)	Operational	?	1982–? M: 1990–	Torsatron	(Ukraine) Kharkiv	National Science Center, Kharkiv Institute of Physics and Technology (NSC KIPT)	1.0 m/0.12 m	1.3 T	?	
Auburn Torsatron (AT)	Shut down	?	1984–1990	Torsatron	(United States) Auburn	Auburn University	0.58 m/0.14 m	0.2 T		Auburn Torsatron
Wendelstein 7-AS	Shut down	1982–1988	1988–2002	Modular, advanced stellarator	(Germany) Garching	Max-Planck-Institut für Plasmaphysik	2 m/0.13 m	2.6 T	First computer-optimized stellarator, first H-mode in a stellarator in 1992	Wendelstein 7-AS
Advanced Toroidal Facility (ATF)	Shut down	1984–1988	1988–1994	Torsatron	(United States) Oak Ridge	Oak Ridge National Laboratory	2.1 m/0.27 m	2.0 T	First large American stellarator after Tokamak stampede, high-beta operation, >1h plasma operation	Advanced Toroidal Facility
Compact Helical System (CHS)	Shut down	?	1989–?	Heliotron	(Japan) Toki	National Institute for Fusion Science	1 m/0.2 m	1.5 T		
Compact Auburn Torsatron (CAT)	Shut down	?–1990	1990–2000	Torsatron	(United States) Auburn	Auburn University	0.53 m/0.11 m	0.1 T	Study magnetic flux surfaces	Compact Auburn Torsatron
H-1 (Heliac-1)	Operational		1992–	Heliac	(Australia) Canberra, (China)	Research School of Physical Sciences and Engineering, Australian National University	1.0 m/0.19 m	0.5 T	shipped to China in 2017	H-1NF plasma vessel
TJ-K (Tokamak de la Junta Kiel)	Operational	TJ-IU (1999)	1994–	Torsatron	(Germany) Kiel, Stuttgart	University of Stuttgart	0.60 m/0.10 m	0.5 T	One helical and two vertical coil sets; Teaching; moved from Kiel to Stuttgart in 2005	
TJ-II (Tokamak de la Junta II)	Operational	1991–1996	1997–	flexible Heliac	(Spain) Madrid	National Fusion Laboratory, Centro de Investigaciones Energéticas, Medioambientales y Tecnológicas	1.5 m/0.28 m	1.2 T	Study plasma in flexible configuration	CAD drawing of TJ-II
LHD (Large Helical Device)	Operational	1990–1998	1998–	Heliotron	(Japan) Toki	National Institute for Fusion Science	3.5 m/0.6 m	3 T	Demonstrated long-term operation of large superconducting coils	LHD cross section
HSX (Helically Symmetric Experiment)	Operational		1999–	Modular, quasi-helically symmetric	(United States) Madison	University of Wisconsin–Madison	1.2 m/0.15 m	1 T	Investigate plasma transport in quasi-helically-symmetric field, similar to tokamaks	HSX with clearly visible non-planar coils
Heliotron J	Operational		2000–	Heliotron	(Japan) Kyoto	Institute of Advanced Energy	1.2 m/0.1 m	1.5 T	Study helical-axis heliotron configuration	
Columbia Non-neutral Torus (CNT)	Operational	?	2004–	Circular interlocked coils	(United States) New York City	Columbia University	0.3 m/0.1 m	0.2 T	Study of non-neutral (mostly electron) plasmas	
Uragan-2(M)	Operational	1988–2006	2006–	Heliotron, Torsatron	(Ukraine) Kharkiv	National Science Center, Kharkiv Institute of Physics and Technology (NSC KIPT)	1.7 m/0.22 m	2.4 T	ℓ=2 Torsatron	
Quasi-poloidal stellarator (QPS)	Cancelled	2001–2007	–	Modular	(United States) Oak Ridge	Oak Ridge National Laboratory	0.9 m/0.33 m	1.0 T	Stellarator research	Engineering drawing of the QPS
NCSX (National Compact Stellarator Experiment)	Cancelled	2004–2008	–	Helias	(United States) Princeton	Princeton Plasma Physics Laboratory	1.4 m/0.32 m	1.7 T	High-β stability	CAD drawing of NCSX
Compact Toroidal Hybrid (CTH)	Operational	?	2007?–	Torsatron	(United States) Auburn	Auburn University	0.75 m/0.2 m	0.7 T	Hybrid stellarator/tokamak	CTH
HIDRA (Hybrid Illinois Device for Research and Applications)	Operational	2013–2014 (WEGA)	2014–	?	(United States) Urbana, IL	University of Illinois	0.72 m/0.19 m	0.5 T	Stellarator and tokamak in one device, capable of long pulse steady-state operation; study plasma-wall interactions	HIDRA after its reassembly in Illinois
UST_2	Operational	2013	2014–	modular three period quasi-isodynamic	(Spain) Madrid	Charles III University of Madrid	0.29 m/0.04 m	0.089 T	3D-printed stellarator	UST_2 design concept
Wendelstein 7-X	Operational	1996–2022	2015–	Helias	(Germany) Greifswald	Max-Planck-Institut für Plasmaphysik	5.5 m/0.53 m	3 T	Steady-state plasma in large fully optimized stellarator	Schematic diagram of Wendelstein 7-X
SCR-1 (Stellarator of Costa Rica)	Operational	2011–2015	2016–	Modular	(Costa Rica) Cartago	Costa Rica Institute of Technology	0.14 m/0.042 m	0.044 T		SCR-1 vacuum vessel drawing
MUSE	Operational	2022–2023	2023–	Quasiaxi-symmetrical	(United States) Princeton	Princeton Plasma Physics Laboratory	0.3 m/0.075 m	0.15 T	First stellarator with permanent magnets	MUSE
CFQS (Chinese First Quasi-Axisymmetric Stellarator)	Operational	2017–2024	2024–	Helias	(China) Chengdu	Southwest Jiaotong University, National Institute for Fusion Science in Japan	1 m/0.25 m	1 T	m=2 quasi-axisymmetric stellarator, modular	CFQS coils and field
Alpha	Planned	2027 ?	2031 ?	Quasi-isodynamic	(Germany) Garching	Proxima Fusion		5–8 T ?	m=4 symmetry, HTS magnets, designed to be the first stellarator with Q>1 gain	
EFPP (European Fusion Power Plant)	Planned	2030 ?	2045 ?	Helias	(Germany)	Gauss Fusion		7–9 T ?	Fusion power plant with 2–3 GW output	
Stellaris	Planned	2033 ?	2039 ?	Quasi-isodynamic	(Germany) Gundremmingen	Proxima Fusion	12.7 m/1.3 m	9 T ?	first commercial power plant, ~1GW net output	

==== Magnetic mirror ====
- Tabletop/Toytop, Lawrence Livermore National Laboratory, Livermore CA.
- DCX/DCX-2, Oak Ridge National Laboratory
- OGRA (Odin GRAm neitronov v sutki, one gram of neutrons per day), Akademgorodok, Russia. A 20-meter-long pipe
- Baseball I/Baseball II Lawrence Livermore National Laboratory, Livermore CA.
- 2X/2XIII/2XIII-B, Lawrence Livermore National Laboratory, Livermore CA.
- TMX, TMX-U Lawrence Livermore National Laboratory, Livermore CA.
- MFTF Lawrence Livermore National Laboratory, Livermore CA.
- Gas Dynamic Trap at Budker Institute of Nuclear Physics, Akademgorodok, Russia.

==== Toroidal Z-pinch ====
- Perhapsatron (1953, USA)
- ZETA (Zero Energy Thermonuclear Assembly) (1957, United Kingdom)

==== Reversed field pinch (RFP) ====
- ETA-BETA II in Padua, Italy (1979–1989)
- RFX (Reversed-Field eXperiment), Consorzio RFX, Padova, Italy
- MST (Madison Symmetric Torus), University of Wisconsin–Madison, United States
- T2R, Royal Institute of Technology, Stockholm, Sweden
- TPE-RX, AIST, Tsukuba, Japan
- KTX (Keda Torus eXperiment) in China (since 2015)

==== Spheromak ====
- Sustained Spheromak Physics Experiment

==== Field-reversed configuration (FRC) ====
- C-2 Tri Alpha Energy
- C-2U Tri Alpha Energy
- C-2W TAE Technologies
- LSX University of Washington
- IPA University of Washington
- HF University of Washington
- IPA- HF University of Washington

==== Other toroidal machines ====
- TMP (Tor s Magnitnym Polem, torus with magnetic field): A porcelain torus with major radius 80 cm, minor radius 13 cm, toroidal field of 1.5 T and plasma current 0.25 MA, predecessor to the first tokamak (1955, USSR)

=== Open field lines ===
==== Plasma pinch ====
- Trisops – 2 facing theta-pinch guns
- FF-2B, Lawrenceville Plasma Physics, United States

==== Levitated dipole ====
- Levitated Dipole Experiment (LDX), MIT/Columbia University, United States

== Inertial confinement experiments ==
=== Laser-driven ===
Device name	Status	Construction	Operation	Description	Peak laser power	Pulse energy	Fusion yield	Location	Organisation	Image
4 pi laser	Shut down	196?		Semiconductor laser	5 GW	12 J		(United States) Livermore	LLNL	
Long path laser	Shut down	1972	1972	First ICF laser with neodymium doped glass (Nd:glass) as lasing medium	5 GW	50 J		(United States) Livermore	LLNL	
Single Beam System (SBS) "67"	Shut down	1971-1973	1973	Single-beam CO_{2} laser	200 GW	1 kJ		(United States) Los Alamos	LANL	
Double Bounce Illumination System (DBIS)	Shut down	1972-1974	1974-1990	First private laser fusion effort, YAG laser, neutron yield 10^{4} to 3×10^{5} neutrons		1 kJ	≈100 nJ	(United States) Ann Arbor, Michigan	KMS Fusion	
MERLIN (Medium Energy Rod Laser Incorporating Neodymium), N78 laser	Shut down	1972-1975	1975-?	Nd:glass laser	100 GW	40 J		(United Kingdom) RAF Aldermaston	AWE	
Cyclops laser	Shut down	1975	1975	Single-beam Nd:glass laser, prototype for Shiva	1 TW	270 J		(United States) Livermore	LLNL	
Janus laser	Shut down	1974-1975	1975	Two-beam Nd:glass laser demonstrated laser compression and thermonuclear burn of deuterium–tritium	1 TW	10 J		(United States) Livermore	LLNL	
Gemini laser, Dual-Beam Module (DBM)	Shut down	≤ 1975	1976	Two-beam CO_{2} laser, tests for Helios	5 TW	2.5 kJ		(United States) Los Alamos	LANL	
Argus laser	Shut down	1976	1976-1981	Two-beam Nd:glass laser, advanced the study of laser-target interaction and paved the way for Shiva	4 TW	2 kJ	≈3 mJ	(United States) Livermore	LLNL	
Vulcan laser (Versicolor Ultima Lux Coherens pro Academica Nostra)	Operational	1976-1977	1977-	8-beam Nd:glass laser, highest-intensity focussed laser in the world in 2005	1 PW	2.6 kJ		(United Kingdom) Didcot	RAL	
Shiva laser	Shut down	1977	1977-1981	20-beam Nd:glass laser; proof-of-concept for Nova; fusion yield of 10^{11} neutrons; found that its infrared wavelength of 1062 nm was too long to achieve ignition	30 TW	10.2 kJ	≈0.1 J	(United States) Livermore	LLNL	
Helios laser, Eight-Beam System (EBS)	Shut down	1975-1978	1978	8-beam CO_{2} laser; Media at Wikimedia Commons	20 TW	10 kJ		(United States) Los Alamos	LANL	
HELEN (High Energy Laser Embodying Neodymium)	Shut down	1976-1979	1979-2009	Two-beam Nd:glass laser	1 TW	200 J		(United Kingdom) Didcot	RAL	
ISKRA-4	Operational	-1979	1979-	8-beam iodine gas laser, prototype for ISKRA-5	10 TW	2 kJ	6 mJ	(Soviet Union) Sarov	RFNC-VNIIEF	
Sprite laser	Shut down	1981-1983	1983-1995	First high-power Krypton fluoride laser used for target irradiation, λ=249 nm	1 TW	7.5 J		(United Kingdom) Didcot	RAL	
Gekko XII	Operational		1983-	12-beam, Nd:glass laser	500 TW	10 kJ		(Japan) Osaka	Institute for Laser Engineering	
Novette laser	Shut down	1981-1983	1983-1984	Nd:glass laser to validate the Nova design, first X-ray laser	13 TW	18 kJ		(United States) Livermore	LLNL	
Antares laser, High Energy Gas Laser Facility (HEGLF)	Shut down		1983	24-beam largest CO_{2} laser ever built. Missed goal of scientific fusion breakeven, because production of hot electrons in target plasma due to long 10.6 μm wavelength of laser resulted in poor laser/plasma energy coupling	200 TW	40 kJ		(United States) Los Alamos	LANL	
PHAROS laser	Operational	198?		Two-beam Nd:glass laser	300 GW	1 kJ		(United States) Washington D.C.	NRL	
Nova laser	Shut down		1984-1999	10-beam NIR and frequency-tripled 351 nm UV laser; fusion yield of 10^{13} neutrons; attempted ignition, but failed due to fluid instability of targets; led to construction of NIF	1.3 PW	120 kJ	30 J	(United States) Livermore	LLNL	
ISKRA-5	Operational	-1989		12-beam iodine gas laser, fusion yield 10^{10} to 10^{11} neutrons	100 TW	30 kJ	0.3 J	(Soviet Union) Sarov	RFNC-VNIIEF	
Aurora laser	Shut down	≤ 1988-1989	1990	96-beam Krypton fluoride laser	≈300 GW	1.3 kJ		(United States) Los Alamos	LANL	
Shenguang-I	Shut down		1990	2-beam Nd:glass laser, λ=1053 nm		1.6 kJ	100 nJ	China	Joint Laboratory of High Power Laser and Physics	
PALS, formerly "Asterix IV"	Operational	-1991	1991-	Iodine gas laser, λ=1315 nm	3 TW	1 kJ		(Germany) Garching, (Czech Republic) Prague	MPQ, CAS	
Trident laser	Operational	198?-1992	1992-2017	3-beam Nd:glass laser; 2 x 400 J beams, 100 ps – 1 us; 1 beam ~100 J, 600 fs – 2 ns	200 TW	500 J		(United States) Los Alamos	LANL	
Nike laser	Operational	≤ 1991-1994	1994-	56-beam, most-capable Krypton fluoride laser for laser target interactions	2.6 TW	3 kJ		(United States) Washington, D.C.	NRL	
OMEGA laser	Operational	?-1995	1995-	60-beam UV frequency-tripled Nd:glass laser, fusion yield 10^{14} neutrons	60 TW	40 kJ	300 J	(United States) Rochester	LLE	
Electra	Operational			Krypton fluoride laser, 5 Hz operation with 90,000+ shots continuous	4 GW	730 J		(United States) Washington D.C.	NRL	
LULI2000	Operational	?	2003-	6-beam Nd:glass laser, λ=1.06 μm, λ=0.53 μm, λ=0.26 μm	500 GW	600 J		(France) Palaiseau	École polytechnique	
OMEGA EP	Operational		2008-	60-beam UV	1.4 PW	5 kJ		(United States) Rochester	LLE	
National Ignition Facility (NIF)	Operational	1997-2009	2010-	192-beam Nd:glass laser, achieved scientific breakeven with fusion gain of 1.5 and 1.2×10^{18} neutrons	500 TW	2.05 MJ	3.15 MJ	(United States) Livermore	LLNL	
Orion	Operational	2006-2010	2010-	10-beams, λ=351 nm	200 TW	5 kJ		(United Kingdom) RAF Aldermaston	AWE	
Laser Mégajoule (LMJ)	Operational	1999-2014	2014-	Second-largest laser fusion facility, 10 out of 22 beam lines operational in 2022	800 TW	1 MJ		(France) Bordeaux	CEA	
Laser for Fast Ignition Experiments (LFEX)	Operational	2003-2015	2015-	High-contrast heating laser for FIREX, λ=1053 nm	2 PW	10 kJ	100 μJ	(Japan) Osaka	Institute for Laser Engineering	
HiPER (High Power Laser Energy Research Facility)	Cancelled	2007-2015	-	Pan-European project to demonstrate the technical and economic viability of laser fusion for the production of energy	(4 PW)	(270 kJ)	(25 MJ)	(European Union)		
Laser Inertial Fusion Energy (LIFE)	Cancelled	2008-2013	-	Effort to develop a fusion power plant succeeding NIF		(2.2 MJ)	(40 MJ)	(United States) Livermore	LLNL	
ISKRA-6	Planned	?	?	128 beam Nd:glass laser	300 TW?	300 kJ?		(Russia) Sarov	RFNC-VNIIEF	

=== Z-pinch ===
- Z Pulsed Power Facility
- ZEBRA device at the University of Nevada's Nevada Terawatt Facility
- Saturn accelerator at Sandia National Laboratory
- MAGPIE at Imperial College London
- COBRA at Cornell University
- PULSOTRON
- Z-FFR (Z(-pinch)-Fission-Fusion Reactor), a nuclear fusion–fission hybrid machine to be built in Chengdu, China by 2025 and generate power as early as 2028

== Inertial electrostatic confinement ==
- Fusor
  - List of fusor examples
- Polywell

== Magnetized target fusion ==
- FRX-L
- FRCHX
- General Fusion – under development
- LINUS project

== See also ==
- List of nuclear reactors
- List of plasma physics software
