= Experimental Advanced Superconducting Tokamak =

Experimental tokamak

Coordinates: 31.91174°N 117.14682°E

EAST
Experimental Advanced Superconducting Tokamak
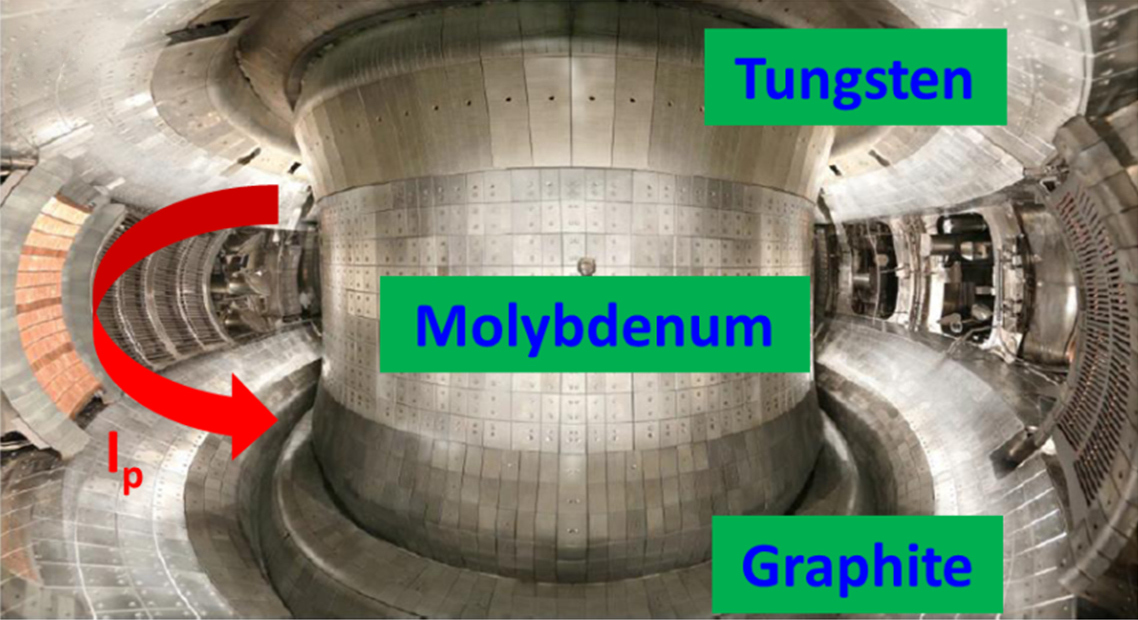
- EAST vacuum vessel
- Device type: Tokamak
- Location: Hefei, China
- Affiliation: Hefei Institutes of Physical Science, Chinese Academy of Sciences

Technical specifications
- Major radius: 1.85 m (6 ft 1 in)
- Minor radius: 0.45 m (1 ft 6 in)
- Magnetic field: 3.5 T (35,000 G)
- Heating power: 7.5 MW
- Discharge duration: 102 s
- Plasma current: 1.0 MA
- Plasma temperature: 100×10^{6} K

History
- Year(s) of operation: 2006–present
- Preceded by: HT-6M
- Succeeded by: Burning Plasma Experimental Superconducting Tokamak

Experimental Advanced Superconducting Tokamak
- Chinese: 先进超导托卡马克实验装置
- Hanyu Pinyin: xiānjìn chāodǎo tuōkǎmǎkè shíyàn zhuāngzhì
- Literal meaning: Advanced Superconducting Tokamak Experimental device
Transcriptions
Standard Mandarin
- Hanyu Pinyin: xiānjìn chāodǎo tuōkǎmǎkè shíyàn zhuāngzhì

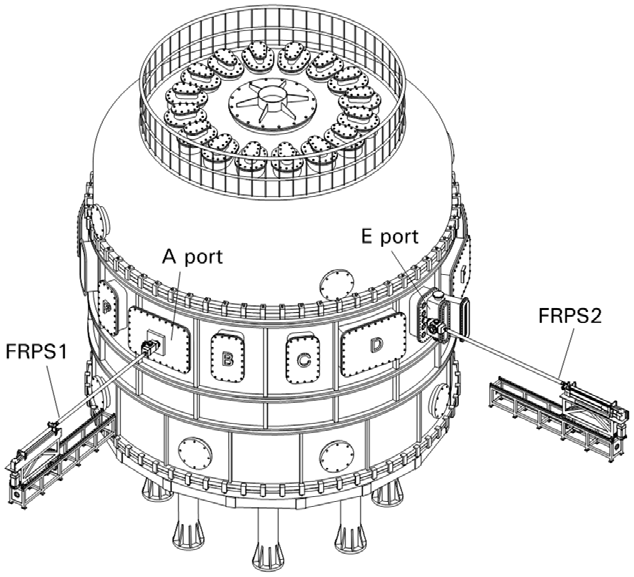
Technical sketch of EAST

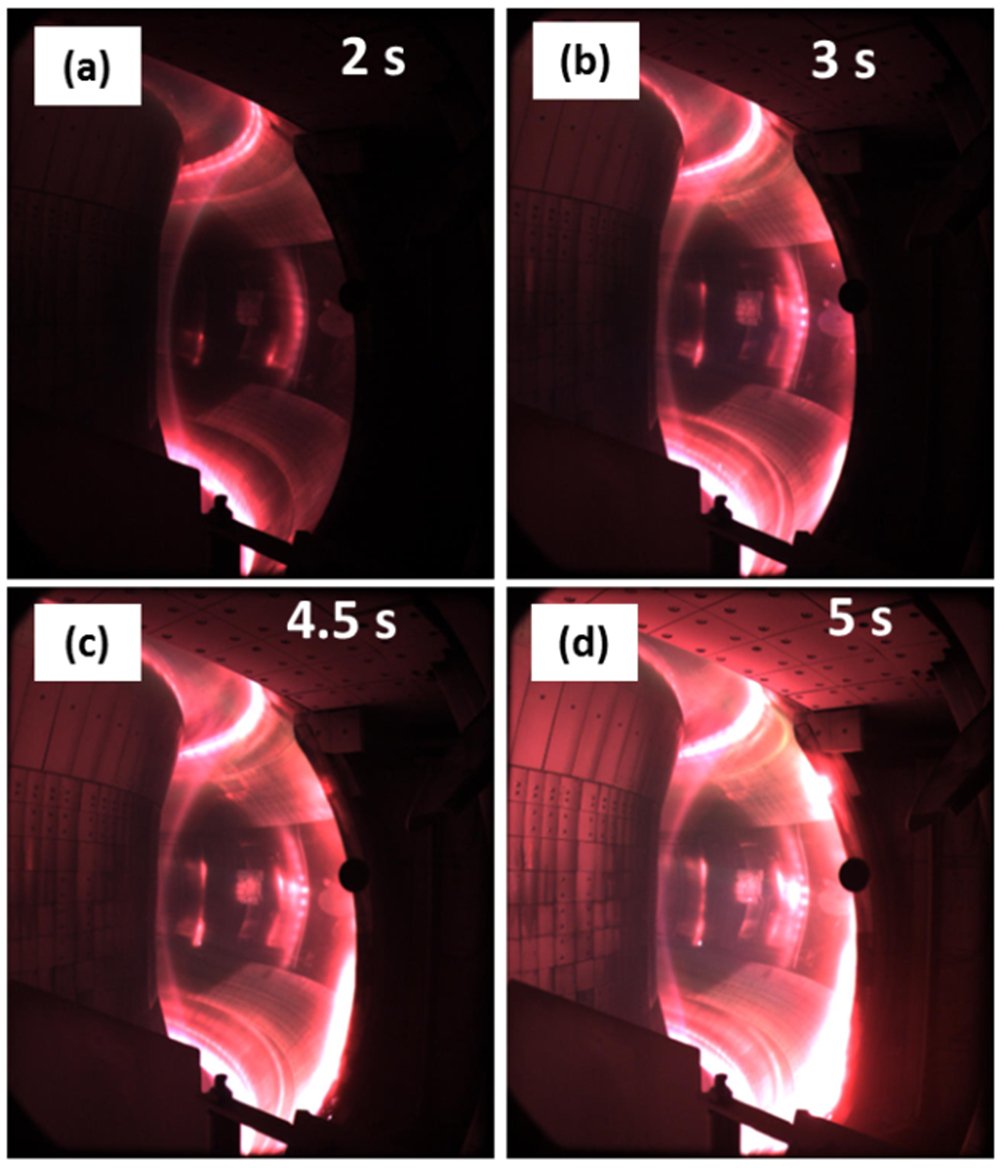
Plasma in EAST

The Experimental Advanced Superconducting Tokamak (EAST), also known as HT-7U (Hefei Tokamak 7 Upgrade), is an experimental superconducting tokamak magnetic fusion energy reactor in Hefei, China. Operated by the Hefei Institutes of Physical Science conducting its experiments for the Chinese Academy of Sciences, EAST began its operations in 2006. EAST is part of the international ITER program after China joined the initiative in 2003 and acts as a testbed for ITER technologies. On January 20, 2025, it sustained plasma for 1066 seconds.

EAST was the first tokamak to utilize superconducting coils to establish both the toroidal and poloidal magnetic fields.

== History ==
EAST followed China's first superconducting tokamak device, dubbed HT-7, built by the Institute of Plasma Physics in partnership with Russia in the early 1990's . It was first proposed in 1996 and approved in 1998. According to a 2003 schedule, buildings and site facilities were to be constructed by 2003. Tokamak assembly was to take place from 2003 through 2005. Construction was completed in March 2006.

According to official reports, the project's budget is CNY ¥300 million (US$37 million), some 1/15 to 1/20 the cost of a comparable reactor built in other countries.

=== Phase I ===
EAST entered its first commissioning phase around March 2006. Shortly after, in-vessel components and diagnostics were assembled.

During initial operation, EAST was able to successfully generate its first plasma on September 28, 2006 in a nearly three second long test, reaching an electric current of 200 kiloamperes. By January 2007, the reactor had progressed to creating a plasma that could last nearly five seconds and generate currents up to 500 kiloamperes.

Three and a half years later, EAST was able to achieve a key milestone on November 7, 2010, achieving an H-mode plasma by low hybrid wave (LHW) injection alone. This was shortly followed by further success, where EAST became the first tokamak to successfully sustain H-Mode plasma for over 30 seconds at ~50 million kelvin in May 2011.

=== Phase II ===
The second phase of EAST was formally entered through a ribbon-cutting ceremony for the EAST auxiliary heating system project, which was held on November 29, 2011.

After a nearly 20-month long upgrading break since September 2012, EAST commenced for the first round of experiments in May 2014. A year later, EAST was reporting currents of up to 1 Megaampere, as well as stable H-mode plasma for 6.4 seconds. Then, almost two years later, EAST was able to break records when it managed to maintain a plasma pulse for 102 seconds at ~50 million °C (90 million °F). During this test EAST was able to generate a plasma with currents of 400 kiloamperes with a density of about 2.4 × 10^{19}/m^{3}. It was observed that the temperature was slowly increasing during this test.

Building on this success, EAST became the first tokamak to successfully sustain H-Mode plasma for more than one minute at ~50 million kelvin on November 2, 2016. In July 2017, it was also the first tokamak to sustain said plasma for more than 100 seconds at the same temperature. The following year, EAST reached a milestone of ~100 million kelvin electron temperature on November 12, 2018. In May 2021, it reached an electron temperature of 120 million °C electron temperature for 101 seconds. On December 30, 2021, a long-pulse high-parameter plasma operation of 1056 seconds was realized, setting another world record for the operation of the Tokamak experimental device.

EAST achieved the world's first 403-second steady-state H-mode plasma on April 12, 2023.

EAST then broke its record 20 months later on January 20, 2025, when it sustained plasma for 1066 seconds.

In January 2026, EAST announced that it had achieved line-averaged electron density in the range of (1.3 to 1.65), significantly above its prior range (0.8 to 1.0). It adopted electron cyclotron resonance heating (ECRH)–assisted ohmic start-up and high initial neutral density. These experiments operated in the density-free regime.

== Physics objectives ==
China is a member of the ITER consortium, and EAST is a testbed for ITER technologies.

EAST was designed to test:

- Superconducting Niobium-titanium poloidal field magnets, making it the first tokamak with superconducting toroidal and poloidal magnets
- Non-inductive current drive
- Pulses of up to 102 seconds with 0.5 MA plasma current
- Schemes for controlling plasma instabilities through real-time diagnostics
- Materials for diverters and plasma facing components
- Operation with β_{N} = 2 and confinement factor H_{89} > 2

== Tokamak parameters ==
Tokamak parameters
Toroidal field, B_{t}	3.5 T
Plasma current, I_{P}	1.0 MA
Major radius, R_{0}	1.85 m
Minor radius, a	0.45 m
Aspect ratio, R/a	4.11
Elongation, κ	1.6–2
Triangularity, δ	0.6–0.8
Ion cyclotron resonance heating (ICRH)	3 MW
Lower hybrid current drive (LHCD)	4 MW
Electron cyclotron resonance heating (ECRH)	None currently (0.5 MW planned)
Neutral beam injection (NBI)	None currently (planned)
Pulse length	1–1000 s
Configuration	Double-null divertor Pump limiter Single null divertor

== See also ==
- Burning Plasma Experimental Superconducting Tokamak (BEST)
- China Fusion Engineering Test Reactor (CFETR)
- HL-2M
- List of fusion experiments
- ASDEX Upgrade
- ITER
- Joint European Torus
- JT-60
- KSTAR
