= ASDEX =

ASDEX may refer to:

- ASDEX (Axially Symmetric Divertor Experiment), a tokamak operated 1980–1990 in Garching, Germany, then continued as HL-2A in China
- ASDEX Upgrade (Axially Symmetric Divertor Experiment Upgrade), a tokamak operated since 1991 in Garching, Germany
- ASDE-X (Airport Surface Detection Equipment, Model X), an airport runway safety tool
