= Tokamak à configuration variable =

Swiss research fusion reactor at the École Polytechnique Fédérale de Lausanne

TCV
Tokamak à configuration variable
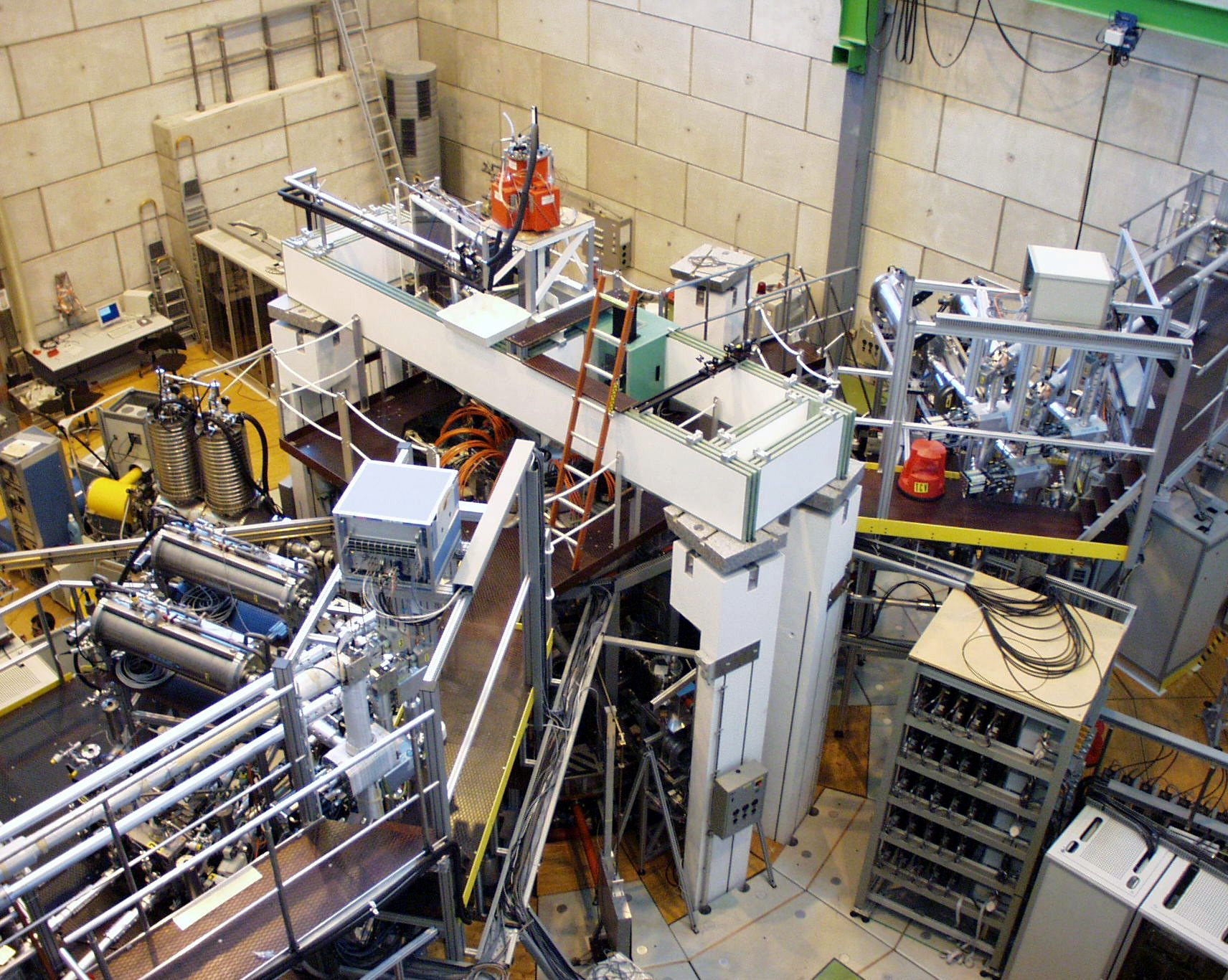
- TCV in 2002
- Device type: Tokamak
- Location: Lausanne, Switzerland
- Affiliation: EPFL Swiss Plasma Center

Technical specifications
- Major radius: 0.88 m (2 ft 11 in)
- Minor radius: 0.25 m (9.8 in)
- Magnetic field: 1.43 T (14,300 G)
- Heating power: 4.5 MW
- Discharge duration: 2 s
- Plasma current: 1.2 MA

History
- Year(s) of operation: 1992–present
- Preceded by: TCA (now TCABR)

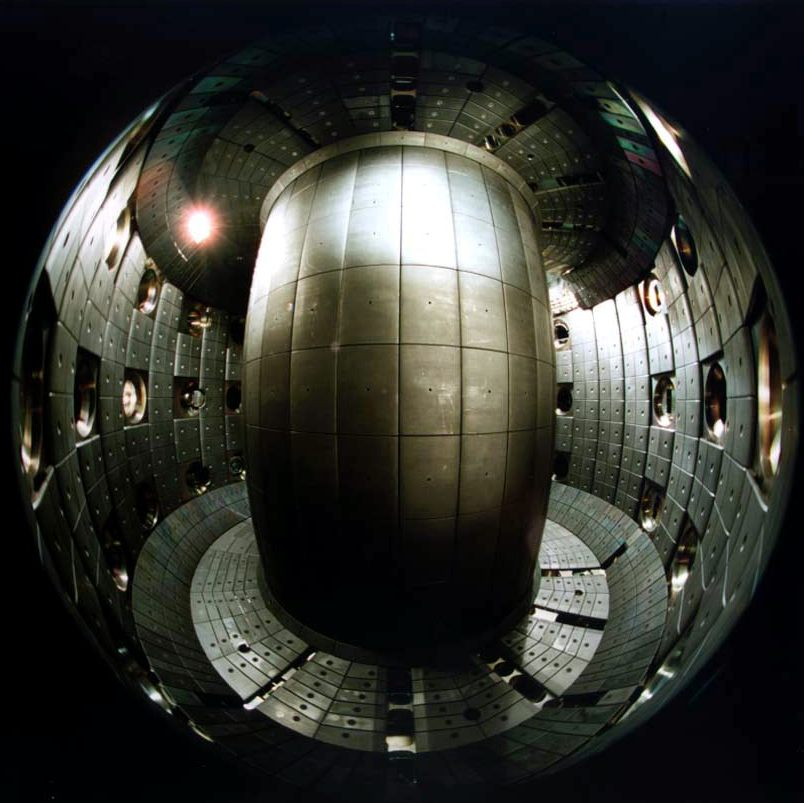
Tokamak à Configuration Variable (TCV): inner view, with the graphite-clad torus. Courtesy of CRPP-EPFL, Association Suisse-Euratom

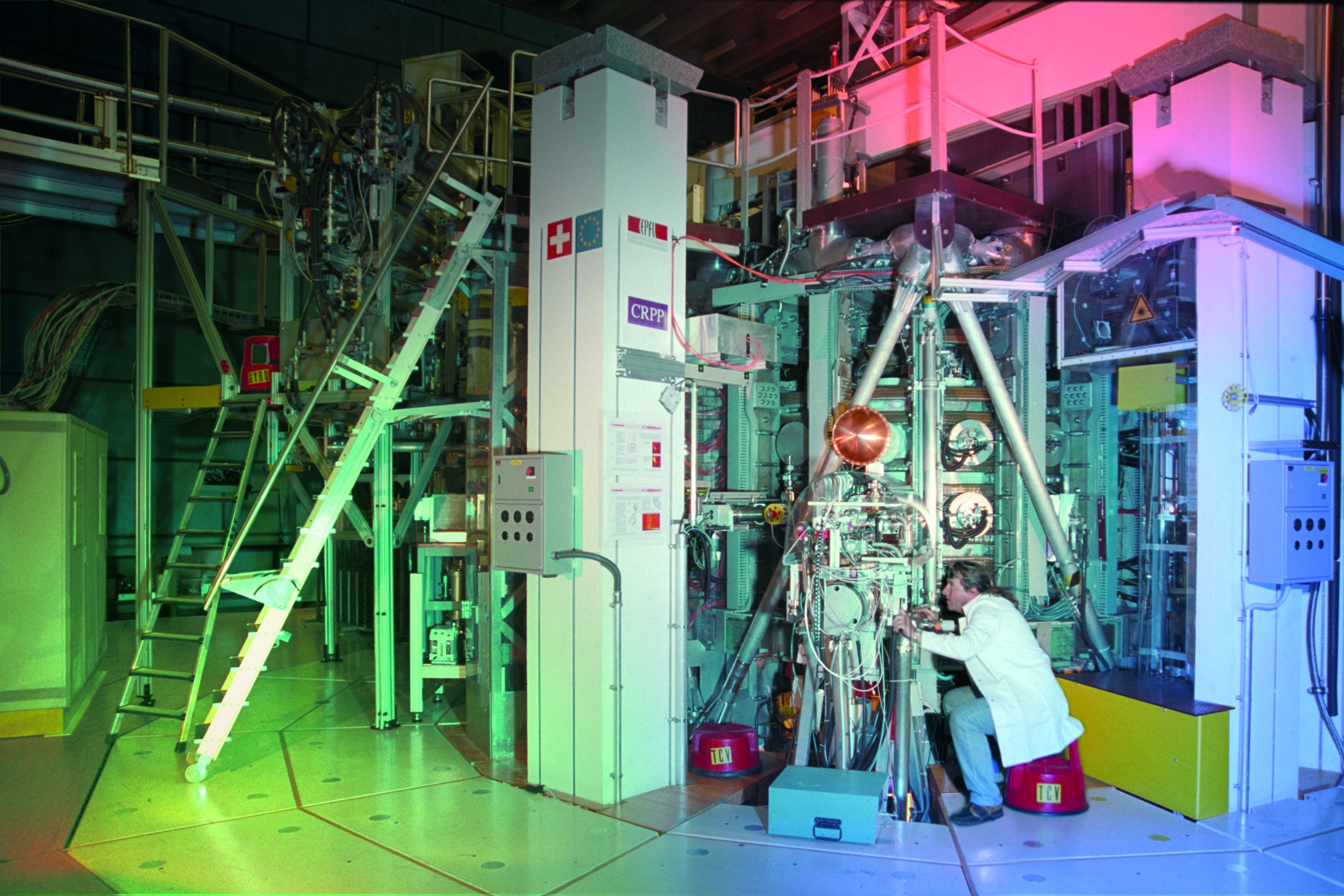
Tokamak à Configuration Variable (TCV): general view of the setup. Courtesy of CRPP-EPFL, Association Suisse-Euratom

The tokamak à configuration variable (TCV, literally "variable configuration tokamak") is an experimental tokamak located at the École Polytechnique Fédérale de Lausanne (EPFL) Swiss Plasma Center (SPC) in Lausanne, Switzerland. As the largest experimental facility of the Swiss Plasma Center, the TCV tokamak explores the physics of magnetic confinement fusion. It distinguishes itself from other tokamaks with its specialized plasma shaping capability, which can produce diverse plasma shapes without requiring hardware modifications.

The research carried out on TCV contributes to the physics understanding for ITER and future fusion power plants such as DEMO. It is currently part of EUROfusion's Medium-Sized Tokamak (MST) programme, alongside ASDEX Upgrade, MAST Upgrade and WEST.

The TCV tokamak produced its first plasma in November 1992 with full tokamak operation starting in June 1993.

== Characteristics ==
=== Plasma shaping ===
TCV features a highly elongated, rectangular vacuum vessel and 16 independently powered coils which facilitate development of new plasma configurations. A notable example is the discovery of significantly improved confinement with the negative triangularity shape in the late 1990s. Novel divertor configurations such as the snowflake divertor were also realised and explored on TCV.

=== ECRH-ECCD system ===
Auxiliary heating is provided by the electron cyclotron resonance heating (ECRH) system. EC power in X-mode supplied by the X2 (second harmonic) and X3 (third harmonic) gyrotrons can be launched from the side or the top. The system can also support non-inductive plasma current via electron cyclotron current drive (ECCD). TCV is the first machine in world which has reported plasma with full current in ECCD in 2000.

=== Neutral beam injection system ===
The neutral beam injection (NBI) system has been operated on TCV from 2015 for direct ion auxiliary heating which facilitates access to plasma regimes with high plasma pressure, a wider range of temperature ratios, and significant fast ion population. TCV currently has two heating neutral beams and a diagnostic neutral beam. The first heating neutral beam injector can provided up to 1.3 MW of heating power.

=== Removable neutral baffles ===
TCV features an "open" divertor historically with limited separation between the divertor region and the main plasma. In 2019, TCV began to operate with removable neutral baffles in order to maximise the divertor neutral compression by limiting the transit of recycling neutrals from the wall to the confined plasma. Baffles of different lengths are available, allowing for experimental study of variable divertor closure.

== Major research and discoveries ==
=== Negative triangularity ===
It is first demonstrated on TCV that negative triangularity, where the plasma cross-section is shaped as backward D shape pointing to the center, can yield significantly improved confinement. It is particularly attractive because edge-localized modes (ELMs) can be avoided as an inherent ELM-free regime, while a core of high confinement is maintained. This has motivated the DIII-D tokamak in San Diego to install additional graphite-tile armor to perform dedicated experimental campaign in early 2023.

In the late nineties, a broad experimental plasma shape survey found that the energy confinement time in L-mode was "degrading strongly as triangularity is increased from zero - or slightly negative - to positive values". This established for the first time the trend with triangularity in L-mode and positive triangularity (PT) domain, contrasting with the trend in H-mode observed elsewhere.

A decisive breakthrough in negative triangularity (NT) L-mode was achieved in TCV with the observation of the linear continuation of improved energy confinement across the full NT domain, by exploring dependencies on density, safety factor, ECRH power and deposition location, finally on plasma elongation and triangularity. The finding was confirmed in a broader campaign.

Power balance analysis revealed that reversing the triangularity from PT to NT (δ = ±0.4) halves the radial energy transport while doubling the energy confinement, thereby isolating the role of collisionality and triangularity in the trapped electron mode transport regime.

In H-mode, gradually decreasing triangularity from PT to NT, leads to higher frequency and smaller to vanishing ELMs, a finding crucial for the integrity of the first wall, as ELM power bursts cannot be tolerated in future large size power plant. In the eighties, NT plasma shapes weren’t popular due to the presence of MHD edge-pressure limiting instabilities. Somewhat ironically, the edge instabilities - high-n ballooning modes - are now welcome as they prevent the formation of H-mode pedestals and therefore ELMs, without adversely affecting the performance of the core plasma, as demonstrated by the recent DIII-D NT campaign. The intense development of NT is summarized in a historical review.

== Main studies ==
- Confinement studies
  - confinement as a function of the shape of the plasma (triangular, square or elongated)
  - Improvement of the confinement of the core
- Studies on vertically elongated plasmas
- Studies with ECRH and ECCD (electron cyclotron resonance heating and electron cyclotron current drive)

== History ==
- 1976: First proposal for an elongated tokamak by the "New Swiss Association"
- 1985: Second proposal, with a more elongated tokamak
- 1986: Acceptance of the TCV proposal (Tokamak à Configuration Variable)
- 1992: First plasma discharge
- 1997: World record of plasma elongation (see plasma shaping)
- by August 2015 it has had a 19-month shutdown/upgrade to install its first neutral beam injector.
