= China Fusion Engineering Test Reactor =

Tokamak

CFETR
China Fusion Engineering Test Reactor
- Device type: Tokamak
- Location: Hefei, Anhui Province, China

Technical specifications
- Major radius: 7.2 m
- Minor radius: 2.2 m
- Magnetic field: 6.5 T
- Plasma current: 14 MA

History
- Preceded by: Burning Plasma Experimental Superconducting Tokamak

The China Fusion Engineering Test Reactor (Chinese: 中国聚变工程实验堆; pinyin: Zhōngguó Jùbiàn Gōngchéng Shíyànduī), or CFETR, is a proposed tokamak fusion reactor, which uses a magnetic field in order to confine plasma and generate energy. As of 2015, tokamak devices are leading candidates for the construction of a viable and practical thermonuclear fusion reactor. These reactors may be used to generate sustainable energy while ensuring a lower environmental impact and a smaller carbon footprint than fossil fuel-based power plants.

The CFETR utilises and intends to build upon pre-existing nuclear fusion research from the International Thermonuclear Experimental Reactor (ITER) program in order to address the gaps between ITER and the next generation thermonuclear plant and successor reactor class to ITER, the Demonstration Power Plant (DEMO).

As of 2019, three domestic fusion test reactors are in operation in China. These include EAST in ASIPP at Hefei, HL-2A(M) at the Southwestern Institute of Physics (SWIP) at Chengdu and J-TEXT located at Huazhong University of Science and Technology in Wuhan. Additionally, as of 2021, in an effort to more accurately simulate a potentially functionally operational CFETR, the HL-2A at SWIP was upgraded to the HL-2M. Construction for the HL-2M was completed in November 2019, and the device was commissioned on December 4, 2020.

The conceptual design of the CFETR, completed in 2015, is largely based on the design of these three domestic fusion reactors. Construction of the CFETR will likely begin in the 2020s, with expected completion by the 2030s.

== Aims and objectives ==
The China Fusion Engineering Test Reactor (CFETR) will operate in two phases. In the first phase, the CFETR will be required to demonstrate steady state operation and tritium self-sufficiency with a tritium breeding ratio > 1. Moreover, in Phase 1, the CFETR should demonstrate generation of fusion power up to 200MW.

The second phase, the DEMO validation phase, requires the CFETR to generate power over 1 GW. More generally, the CFETR will also serve as a research and development tool for the testing of various structural and functional materials to identify or develop a material with a high neutron flux resistance.

== Design ==
As of 2019, design for the CFETR was ongoing in its engineering design phase, which was expected to be completed between 2020 and 2021. The first stage, between 2010 and 2015, is referred to as the concept design stage. It was necessary to demonstrate the economic viability of the construction of a small-scale machine. Moreover, this stage provided a proof of concept for the construction of a cost-effective fusion reactor capable of generating power.

The second phase of design, the engineering design phase, began in 2015, directed towards the design of a large-scale machine with the aim of achieving 1 GW power output per DEMO's validation requirement. Since 2017, research moved towards simulating various operating scenarios, researching the nuance of various experimental designs of individual CFETR components, such as the full-sized vacuum vessel and tritium breeding technology.

As of 2019, discoveries made since the conceptual and engineering phases of research were being consolidated, integrated and built upon.

== Challenges ==
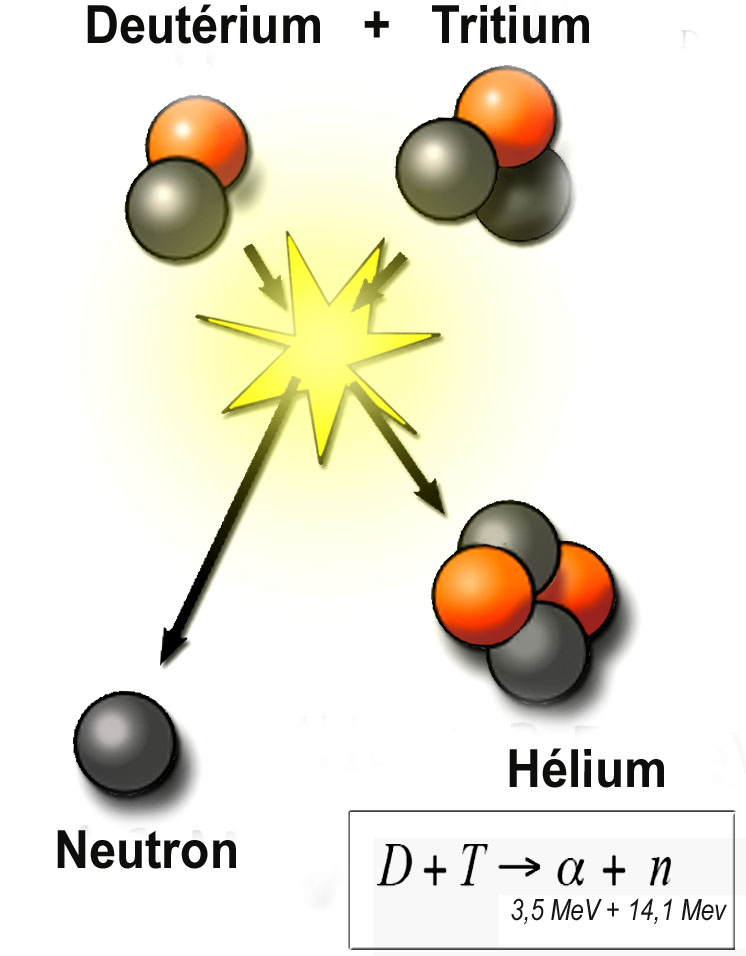
Schematic of fusion reaction: Deuterium and Tritium undergo fusion reaction to produce a single neutron, helium and energy.

=== Location, resource and infrastructure ===
The China Fusion Engineering Test Reactor is planned in Hefei, Anhui province. Some critical issues are still yet to be resolved, this includes 19 key system problems such as vertical instability control with internal coils, impurity control, alpha particle transport, disruption avoidance and mitigation, type-I ELM control and avoidance, technologies for the large heating power, tritium breeding and handling. Moreover, whilst the properties of materials needed for the construction of the CFETR are known, many of these materials have yet to be fabricated and research is still ongoing for the creation of required materials.

Furthermore, self-sufficiency of the CFETR is one of the greatest challenges. Deuterium and tritium are the fuel sources for the CFETR, and whilst deuterium is naturally abundant, commercial tritium sources are scarce. Whilst tritium can be produced under lab conditions using heavy water reactors, accelerators and light water reactors, the present amount of tritium being produced internationally is insufficient for operating fusion reactors. As such, key challenges are creating an appropriate fuel cycle concept for tritium recycling and renewal as well as formulating novel methods to produce tritium in an economical and cost-effective manner.

These challenges are multifaceted and complex, requiring interdisciplinary co-operation and research. As such, to tackle the 19 key system problems posed by the CFETR, individual teams have been formed to tackle each issue in isolation. This initiative is spearheaded by the Comprehensive Research Facility for Fusion Technology (CRAFT) and their team of 300 scientists, engineers and researchers in China in an attempt to resolve these critical issues by offering practical, viable and cost-effective solutions.

=== Economic viability ===
Prior to the introduction of renewable energy sources such as solar and wind power, fusion was touted as the future of clean and net zero carbon energy. However, the introduction, greater widespread application, and utilisation of renewable energy has drastically altered the energy landscape. For instance, renewables are projected to supply 74% of the global energy by 2050. Moreover, with renewable energy prices falling, the economic viability of fusion power has been brought to the forefront of the discourse of the future economics of energy.

Levelized Cost of Energy (LCOE) for various sources of energy including Wind, Solar and Nuclear energy.

Presently, economists suggest fusion power is unlikely to be as cheap as renewable energy. Fusion plants, much like fission plants, will have large start up and capital costs as the cost of the materials, machinery and infrastructure required to construct these fusions plants is likely to be exorbitant. Moreover, the operation and maintenance of these highly specialised plants are likely to be costly as well. While the operation and construction costs of the CFETR are not well known, an EU DEMO fusion concept is projected to have a levelized cost of energy (LCOE) of $121/MWh.

Furthermore, economists suggest that fusion energy becomes $16.5/ MWh more costly for every $1 billion increase in the price of fusion technology. This high LCOE is largely a result of high capital costs incurred in the construction of fusion plants.

In contrast, the LCOE of renewables appears substantially lower. For instance, the LCOE of solar energy appears to be $40-$46/ MWh, onshore wind is estimated at $29-$56/ MWh, and offshore wind is approximately $92/ MWh. As such, these cost-effective options appear to be the more economically viable ones.

However, this is not to suggest that fusion power may lack complete economic viability. Rather, fusion power will likely supply the energy gaps renewables are not able to fill. Thus, fusion power will likely work in tandem with renewable energy sources rather than become the primary source of energy. Still, in instances where renewable energy may not be readily available, fusion power could become the dominant source of energy and supply the base load of the electrical grid within those specific geographical areas.

=== Safety ===
As of 2021, the following two safety goals have been proposed in the international community:

- Protecting communities and the environment from radiological hazards
- Ensuring fusion reactor safety protocols are as competitive and comprehensive as those of fission reactors

These goals are determined using the principle of acceptable risks and can be further broken down into subcategories including occupational radiation exposure, routine release of radioactive materials, accident response and minimization, and radioactive waste.

Nuclear safety is regarded highly by the Chinese government, though to date, no comprehensive nuclear fusion safety framework exists within China. As of 2019, safety protocols followed in China are based on fission reactor technology; these are outlined in Law of the People's Republic of China on Prevention and Control of Radioactive pollution (2003), Nuclear Safety Act (2017) and Regulations on Safe Operation of Research Reactors (HAF202). While these are beneficial in outlining general nuclear safety considerations, these are not fusion reactor specific. Furthermore, unlike fission reactors, the CFETR does not have a reactor core. Hence, these pieces of legislation need to be updated to accommodate the design and mechanisms of fusion reactors.

Moreover, while it is widely accepted that fusion power will be safer than fission due to the plasma cooling mechanism of the tokamak style device which cools the reactor and halts reactions upon disturbances to the system, the reliance on this ideal and mechanism alone is not sufficient. Rather, disturbance parameters need to be appropriately defined and identified to prevent potential release of radioactive materials upon system disturbances or failure. Hence appropriate safety measures need to be carefully considered. Moreover, tritium is a limited radioactive isotope. As such, the radioactive nature of tritium may prove hazardous in instances of hypothetical accidental release upon dual confinement system failure. Thus, under such circumstances, areas surrounding the CFETR will have to be evacuated and it will be 32–54 years before families may be able to return to their original homes. However, CFETR engineers are designing the current reactor according to a no-evacuation criterion. As such, technical engineers are required to produce a design which safeguards against any catastrophic failure of the fusion reactor which would require evacuation.

As of November 2020, the International Atomic Energy Agency (IAEA) has begun working with various nations to create fusion reactor safety standards for various fusion reactor designs. Moreover, they have begun investigating appropriate dose regulations as well as how radioactive waste from fusion energy should be managed and appropriately disposed of.

=== Waste products ===
Neutron radiation damage in solid vessel walls is expected to be greater than that of fission reactors due to higher neutron energies. Moreover, this damage in tandem with large volumes of helium and hydrogen produced within the vessel is likely to result in infrastructural fatigue, thereby potentially damaging the vessel as well as transforming the vessel into radioactive metal and thereby radioactive waste. Moreover, scientists have posited that many non-structural components will become highly radioactive.

The radioactivity per kilogram of waste would be substantially lower for the fusion reactor compared to the fission reactor. While the nature of the deuterium–tritium fusion reaction is such that it will likely produce greater volumes of radioactive structural and non-structural waste, this issue may be circumvented with the engineering of low-activation structure alloys in order to ensure that these discarded materials qualify as low-level radioactive waste. However, with the presently available technology, the more likely outcome is the engineering of intermediate-activation structural alloys. This will result in the production of low- to intermediate-level radioactive waste.

The radioactivity of such wastes has a half-life of 12.3 years, and so will persist as radioactive for approximately <100 years, compared to fission radioactive waste, which remains highly radioactive for approximately 1000 years. Moreover, engineers behind the CFETR intend to limit output of intermediate to low level radioactive waste by introducing tritiated waste management systems. This has the two-fold effect of extracting tritium to be recycled back into the machine and reducing the radioactivity of the waste produced by the fusion reactor.

== Future ==
On December 4, 2020, the HL-2M was heated to approximately 150 million degrees Celsius, ten times hotter than the sun's core. The successful construction and operation of the HL-2M at SWIP has likely provided an impetus to transition the CFETR into construction phase from its present engineering design phase.

With China actively shifting towards developing its renewable and sustainable energy sector, the construction of the CFETR is not question of whether it will happen but rather when. According to the present fusion timeline, the CFETR is likely to begin its construction phase in the 2020s and an industrial prototype is likely to be completed by 2035, with wide-scale commercial application by 2050. Moreover, by 2025 China is expected to achieve the capacity for 79 GW of nuclear power. To achieve this goal, the construction of nuclear facilities is heavily emphasized in China's 14th 5-year plan (2021-2025) as the country moves towards carbon neutrality.

== See also ==
- Burning Plasma Experimental Superconducting Tokamak (BEST)
- Experimental Advanced Superconducting Tokamak (EAST)
- Energy policy of China
- Nuclear power in China
- Pollution in China
- Renewable energy in China
- KSTAR
