= Enormous Toroidal Plasma Device =

Experimental physics device

Coordinates: 34.0606°N 118.4493°W

The Enormous Toroidal Plasma Device (ETPD) is an experimental physics device housed at the Basic Plasma Science Facility at University of California, Los Angeles (UCLA). It previously operated as the Electric Tokamak (ET) between 1999 and 2006 and was noted for being the world's largest tokamak. It was briefly decommissioned on the retirement of its principal investigator, but was revived as the ETPD in 2009. At present, the machine is undergoing upgrades to be re-purposed into a general laboratory for experimental plasma physics research.

== As the Electric Tokamak ==
Electric Tokamak
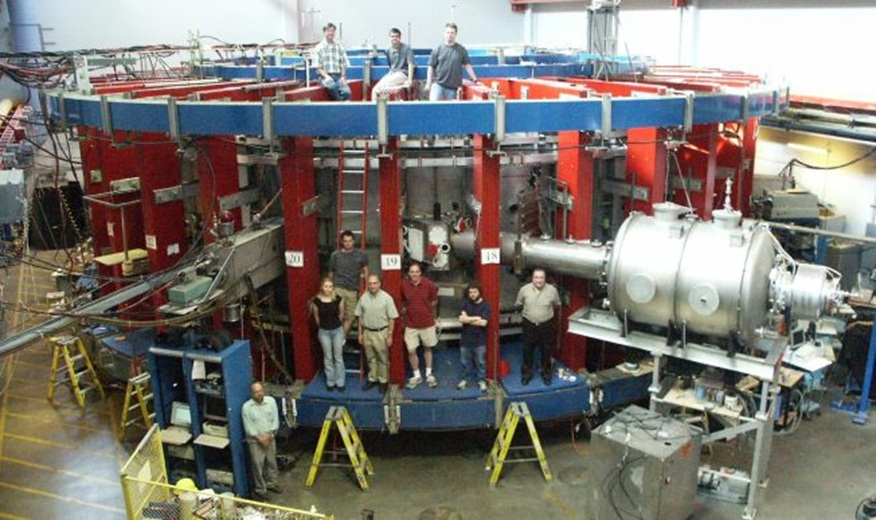
- A top view of the Electric Tokamak.
- Device type: Tokamak
- Location: Los Angeles, California, US
- Affiliation: UCLA

Technical specifications
- Major radius: 5 m (16 ft)
- Minor radius: 1 m (3 ft 3 in)
- Plasma volume: 188 m^{3}
- Magnetic field: 0.25 T (2,500 G)
- Heating power: 2 MW
- Plasma current: 30–45 kA

History
- Year(s) of operation: 1999–2006

The Electric Tokamak (ET) was the last of a series of tokamak machines built in 1998 under the direction of principal investigator and designer, Robert Taylor, a UCLA professor. Compared to leading contemporary tokamaks, it had a larger volume but weaker magnets. Its design field was 0.25 T compared with 3.45 T on the Joint European Torus. Despite its relatively low cost due to weaker magnets, ET was the largest tokamak ever built at its time, with a vacuum vessel slightly bigger than that of JET. It was conceived to try to achieve a relatively high energy confinement time by size alone.

The first plasma was achieved in January 1999. The ET is capable of producing a plasma current of 45 kiloamperes and can produce a core electron plasma temperature of 300 eV.

It is composed of 16 vacuum chambers made of 1-inch thick steel. Four sets of independent coils are necessary for OH (ohmic heating) current drive, vertical equilibrium field, plasma elongation and plasma shaping (D or reverse-D). The OH system provides 10 V·s using a 10 kA power supply. Up to 0.1 T of vertical field can be applied for horizontal control and this is more than sufficient for all plasma configurations, including high beta. An additional set of coils provide a small horizontal field to correct for error field and to stabilize the plasma vertically. All the coils are located outside the vessel and are constructed out of aluminium. It has a relatively large aspect ratio at 5, compared with 3 of most modern conventional tokamaks.

A Rogowski probe outside the vessel and sets of Hall probes inside the vessel are used to monitor plasma current, position and shaping and are used in the control feedback loop. The poloidal system was designed using an in-house equilibrium code as well as a variety of other codes in order to cross-check computations and to assess the stability of the resulting plasma.

Like most tokamaks, the machine uses a combination of RF heating and neutral beam injection to drive and shape the plasma.

=== Decommission in 2006 ===
In 2006, the ET had run out of funding and was decommissioned following the retirement of Taylor. Factors leading to loss of funding are attributed to the lack of extensive plasma diagnostics, its large size, and its place in the politics of fusion. When it was operating, the ET was funded mostly by the Department of Energy (DOE).

== As the Enormous Toroidal Plasma Device ==
In 2009, the Electric Tokamak (ET) was renamed to the Enormous Toroidal Plasma Device (ETPD) and was re-purposed for basic plasma research. A lanthanum hexaboride (LaB_{6}) plasma source was developed for the ETPD (similar to the one used in the Large Plasma Device), and is capable of producing a long column of magnetized plasma (~100 m) that winds itself multiple times along the toroidal axis of the machine. The plasma column was shown to be current-free and terminates on the neutral gas within the chamber without touching the machine walls.

The typical operational parameters of the ETPD are:

- Density: n ≤ 3 × 10^{13} cm^{−3}
- Electron temperature: 5 eV < T_{e} < 30 eV
- Ion temperature 1 eV < T_{i} < 16 eV
- Background field: B = 250 gauss (25 mT)
- Plasma beta: β ~ 1

The ETPD is currently in the process of being upgraded (i.e. larger sources, better diagnostic capabilities) to support a wide range of plasma physics experiments.

== See also ==
- Large Plasma Device, a linear plasma device housed in the same facility as the ETPD
