= HT-7 =

Experimental tokamak

Coordinates: 31°51′N 117°16′E

Hefei Tokamak-7
- Device type: Tokamak
- Location: Hefei, China
- Affiliation: Institute of Plasma Physics, Chinese Academy of Sciences

Technical specifications
- Major radius: 1.22 m (4 ft 0 in)
- Minor radius: 0.27 m (11 in)
- Magnetic field: 1–2 T (10,000–20,000 G) (toroidal)
- Fusion power: 1.5 MW
- Plasma current: 0.2 MA

History
- Date(s) of construction: May 1994
- Year(s) of operation: 1995–2013
- Preceded by: T-7
- Succeeded by: Experimental Advanced Superconducting Tokamak (EAST)

HT-7, or Hefei Tokamak-7, is an experimental superconducting tokamak nuclear fusion reactor built in Hefei, China, to investigate the process of developing fusion power. The HT-7 was developed with the assistance of Russia, and was based on the earlier T-7 tokamak reactor. The reactor was built by the Hefei-based Institute of Plasma Physics under the direction of the Chinese Academy of Sciences.

The HT-7 construction was completed in May 1994, with final tests accomplished by December of the same year allowing experiments to proceed.

The HT-7 has been superseded by the Experimental Advanced Superconducting Tokamak (EAST) built in Hefei by the Institute of Plasma Physics as an experimental reactor before ITER is completed.

== See also ==
- List of fusion experiments § Tokamak
