= DIII-D =

Fusion energy facility in California, US

Coordinates: 32°53′36.46″N 117°14′4.40″W

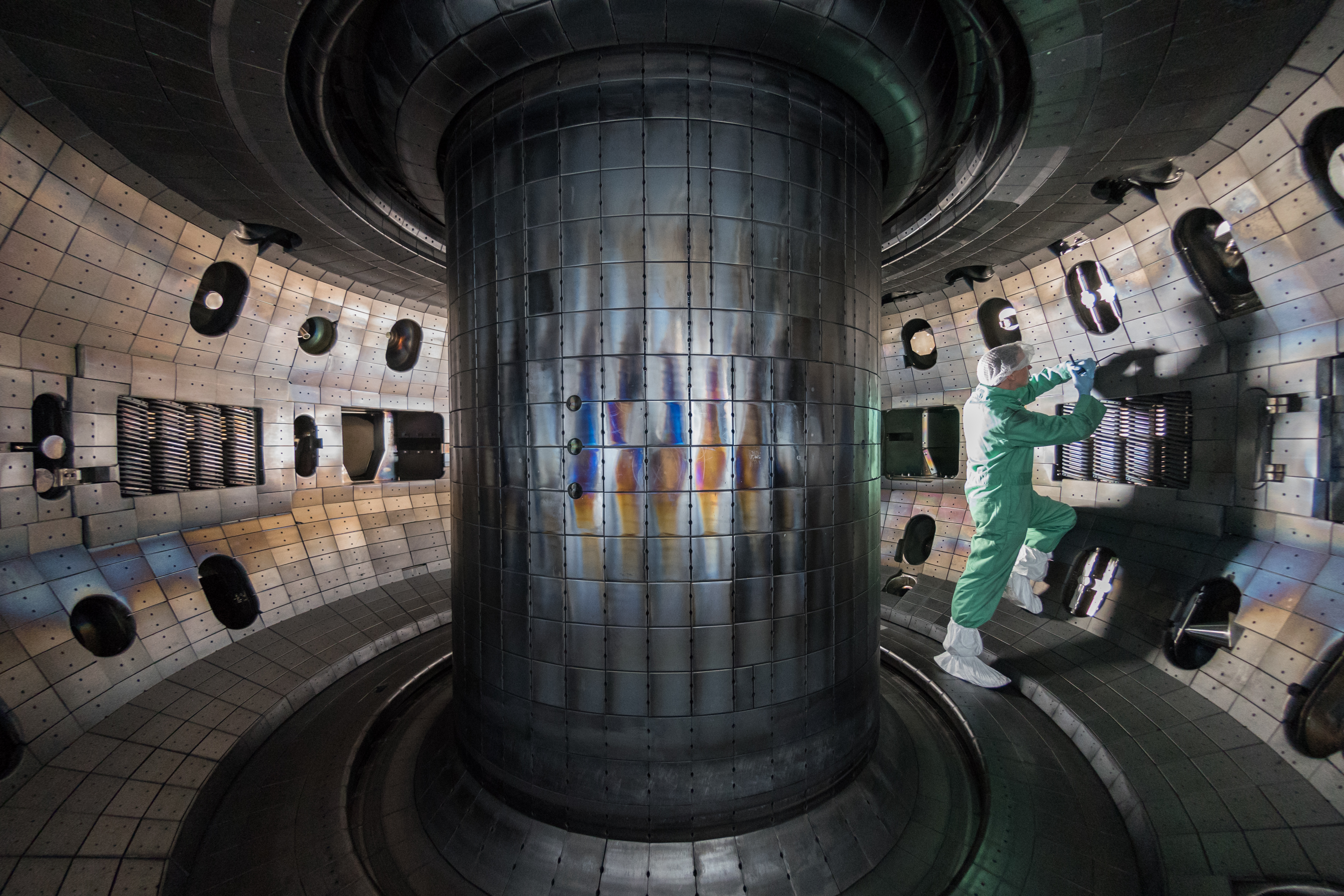
- A worker inside the DIII-D vessel
- Device type: Tokamak
- Location: San Diego, California, US
- Affiliation: General Atomics

Technical specifications
- Major radius: 1.67 m (5 ft 6 in)
- Minor radius: 0.67 m (2 ft 2 in)
- Magnetic field: 2.2 T (22,000 G) (toroidal)
- Heating power: 23 MW
- Plasma current: up to 2.0 MA

History
- Year(s) of operation: 1986–present
- Preceded by: Doublet III

DIII-D also known as "D3D" is a tokamak that has been operated since the late 1980s by General Atomics (GA) in San Diego, California, for the United States Department of Energy. The DIII-D National Fusion Facility is part of the ongoing effort to achieve magnetically confined fusion. The mission of the DIII-D Research Program is to establish the scientific basis for the optimization of the tokamak approach to fusion energy production.

DIII-D was built on the basis of the earlier Doublet III, the third in a series of machines built at GA to experiment with tokamaks having non-circular plasma cross sections. This work demonstrated that certain shapes strongly suppressed a variety of instabilities in the plasma, which led to much higher plasma pressure and performance. DIII-D is so-named because the plasma is shaped like the letter D, a shaping that is now widely used on modern designs, and has led to the class of machines known as "advanced tokamaks." Advanced tokamaks are characterized by operation at high plasma β through strong plasma shaping, active control of various plasma instabilities, and achievement of steady-state current and pressure profiles that produce high energy confinement for high fusion gain (ratio of fusion power to heating power).

DIII-D is one of two large magnetic fusion experiments in the U.S. (the other being NSTX-U at Princeton Plasma Physics Laboratory) supported by the U.S. Department of Energy Office of Science. The program is focusing on R&D for pursuing steady-state advanced tokamak operation and supporting design and operation of the ITER experiment now under construction in France. ITER is designed to demonstrate a self-sustained burning plasma that will produce 10 times as much energy from fusion reactions as it requires for heating.

== DIII-D research program ==
The DIII-D research program is a large international collaboration, with over 600 users participating from more than 100 institutions. General Atomics operates the San Diego–based facility for the Department of Energy through the Office of Fusion Energy Sciences.

Research in DIII-D aims to elucidate the basic physics processes that govern the behavior of a hot magnetized plasma, and to establish a scientific basis for future burning plasma devices such as ITER. Ultimately, the goal is to use this understanding to develop an economically attractive fusion power plant.

The tokamak consists of a toroidal vacuum chamber surrounded by magnetic field coils which contain and shape the plasma. The plasma is created by applying a voltage to generate a large electric current (more than one million amperes) in the chamber. The plasma is heated to temperatures ten times hotter than that of the sun by a combination of high-power neutral beams and microwaves. The plasma conditions are measured using instrumentation based on intense lasers, microwaves, and other precision plasma diagnostics.

Experiments explore such topics as confinement, transient events, and power and particle exhaust. DIII-D is also used as a test bed to investigate innovative mechanisms for plasma heating, fueling and current drive.

== History ==
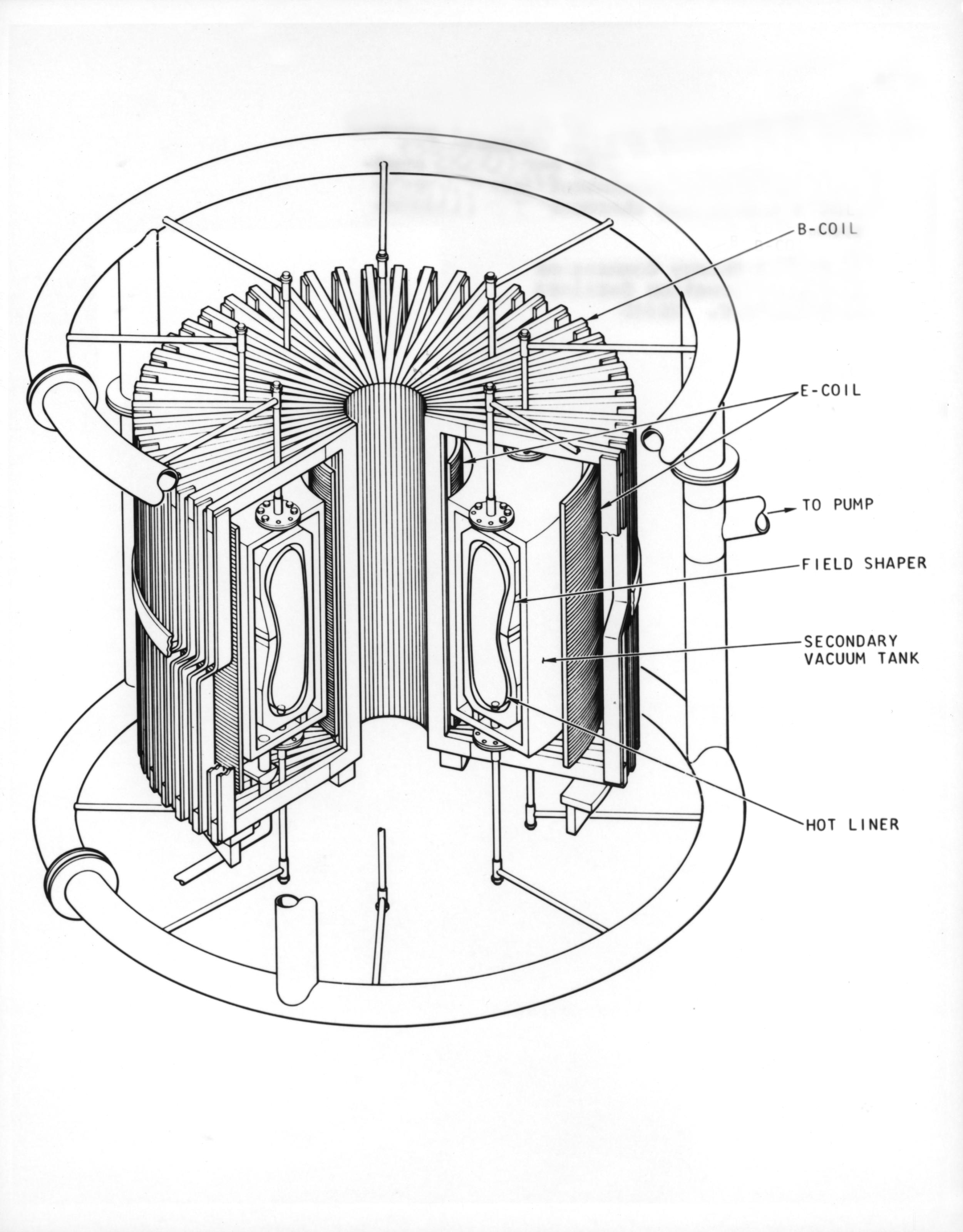
Schematic of Doublet II

In May 1974, AEC selected General Atomics to build the Doublet III magnetic fusion experiment based on the success of earlier Doublet I and II magnetic confinement experiments. In Feb 1978, the Doublet III fusion experiment achieved its first operation with plasma at General Atomics. The machine was later upgraded and renamed DIII-D in 1986.

The DIII-D program achieved several milestones in fusion development, including the highest plasma β (ratio of plasma pressure to magnetic pressure) ever achieved at the time (early 1980s) and the highest neutron flux (fusion rate) ever achieved at the time (early 1990s). Major scientific discoveries include the validation of sheared flow suppression of turbulence in the 1990s as well as both active and passive edge localized mode suppression mechanisms in the 2000s.

In 2021, the program announced an improved boundary cooling approach, replacing a gaseous solution with a mixture of boron, boron nitride, and lithium powders. This dissipated the plasma's heat and protected the reactor walls.
