= ISKRA lasers =

Short pulse lasers

ISKRA lasers are short pulse lasers which were built by the Soviet Union at RFNC-VNIIEF in Arzamas-16 (Арзама́с-16) with the approximately 2 kJ output ISKRA-4 laser being completed in 1979 and the 30 kJ output ISKRA-5 laser which was completed in 1989.

The main use for both lasers being the investigation into inertial confinement fusion, high energy density physics and nuclear weapons research. The Russian laser fusion program was first initiated on the suggestion of Andrei Sakharov in 1962 concerning the possibility that lasers may be capable of achieving the conditions for fusion in imploding spherically symmetrical fuel capsules.

== ISKRA-4 ==
The ISKRA-4 laser is a spatially filtered (image relayed) 8 beam photolytically pumped iodine gas laser capable of producing laser pulse energies of around 2 kJ (pulsewidth of about 1 ns) at its fundamental emission wavelength of 1.315 micrometers, though it is also capable of operating in a frequency doubled configuration where it emits light at 658 nm with a pulse energy of around 500 J. ISKRA-4 produced its first thermonuclear neutrons from imploding DT fuel capsules in 1981.

== ISKRA-5 ==
The ISKRA-5 laser is a spatially filtered (image relayed) 12 beam photolytically pumped iodine gas laser capable of producing laser pulse energies of around 30 kJ and peak pulse powers of around 100 terawatts (pulsewidth about 0.3 ns) at its fundamental emission wavelength of 1.315 micrometers. ISKRA-5, like ISKRA-4, also has the capability for frequency doubling to the second harmonic. Maximum fusion yield on ISKRA-5 is about 10^{10} to 10^{11} neutrons per target shot.

== ISKRA-6 ==
ISKRA-6 is a laser under investigation for future construction by VNIIEF which would be in the near-NIF and LMJ class of extremely high energy, high power frequency tripled Nd:glass lasers used to access the ignition regime of imploding DT fusion fuel capsules for nuclear weapons research. ISKRA-6 would be a 128 beam laser capable of irradiating targets with ~300 kJ of laser light at the 351 nm third harmonic with pulsewidths of around 1 to 3 ns.

ISKRA-6 is planned to have 10 times the energy of ISKRA-5.

== See also ==
- Laser
- Arzamas-16
- List of laser types
