= Burning Plasma Experimental Superconducting Tokamak =

Experimental tokamak

BEST
Burning Plasma Experimental Superconducting Tokamak
- Device type: Tokamak
- Location: Hefei, Anhui, China
- Affiliation: Institute of Plasma Physics, Chinese Academy of Sciences

Technical specifications
- Major radius: 3.60 m (11.8 ft)
- Minor radius: 1.10 m (3 ft 7 in)
- Plasma volume: 140 m^{3}
- Magnetic field: 6.15 T (61,500 G)
- Heating power: 50 MW
- Fusion power: 250 MW
- Plasma current: 7 MA

History
- Date(s) of construction: 2023
- Year(s) of operation: 2027(expected)
- Preceded by: EAST(HT-7U)
- Succeeded by: China Fusion Engineering Test Reactor(CFETR)

The Burning Plasma Experimental Superconducting Tokamak (BEST) is a compact, high-field superconducting tokamak under construction in Hefei, Anhui, China. Developed by the Institute of Plasma Physics, Chinese Academy of Sciences (ASIPP), BEST is designed to conduct deuterium–tritium (D–T) fusion experiments and investigate Burning-plasma, a state in which the energy deposited in the plasma by fusion-produced alpha particles provides a significant portion of the heating required to sustain the fusion reaction. Construction of BEST began in 2023, with first plasma currently targeted for late 2027.

Its research programme aims to achieve scientific breakeven (Q ≥ 1), develop long-pulse D–T operation and investigate alpha-particle heating and burning-plasma physics at approximately (Q ≤ 5).

== Design ==
BEST is designed as a compact, high-field superconducting tokamak for deuterium–tritium fusion experiments. The machine has a major radius (R0) = 3.6m and minor radius(a) = 1.1 m (aspect ratio A ~ 3.27). The plasma volume is approximately 140–142 m³ and the plasma surface area is about 220 m². Nominal plasma elongation reaches ~ 1.88 and triangularity ~ 0.49. The device is designed for a central toroidal magnetic field 6.15 T and plasma currents up to 7 MA. Auxiliary heating power is nominally ~50 MW. The relatively high magnetic field allows BEST to achieve high plasma performance within a smaller physical envelope than larger devices such as ITER. The tokamak uses a combination of toroidal and poloidal magnetic fields to confine the plasma. The toroidal-field system provides the principal magnetic field around the torus, while the poloidal-field system controls plasma position, shape and equilibrium. Plasma current is established and controlled using the central solenoid and auxiliary current-drive systems.

== Technical description ==
=== Magnetic confinement system ===
==== Toroidal-field coils ====
16 D-shaped coils fabricated with cable-in-conduit conductor (CICC) technology. The design is graded, using ITER-standard Nb₃Sn in lower-field regions and high-current-density Nb₃Sn in higher-field regions. Each coil weighs approximately 87 t in the winding-pack baseline.It stores roughly three times the magnetic energy of a comparable ITER TF coil. Sixteen coils generate the 6.15 T central field. Ferromagnetic inserts reduce toroidal field ripple to below 0.9 %.

==== Poloidal-field coils ====
The seven PF coils use a hybrid superconducting configuration. PF1, PF6 and PF7 use Nb₃Sn, while PF2–PF5 use niobium–titanium (NbTi). The PF system is used to establish and control the plasma magnetic equilibrium and configuration.

==== Central solenoid ====
Six independent modules with a total mass of 180 t. Each module employs a hybrid CICC combining Nb₃Sn (LTS) and YBCO/REBCO (HTS). Nominal operating current is 46.5 kA, producing peak fields of 18.8 T (HTS sections) and 12.4 T (LTS sections). Total flux capacity is 53 V·s. A prototype HTS CS coil has demonstrated stable 60 kA operation with 6.03 MJ stored energy and joint resistance of ~0.87 nΩ.

==== Correction coils ====
BEST incorporates eight correction coils for correcting non-axisymmetric magnetic-field errors during plasma operation. Magnetic-field-error analysis for BEST indicates that the error-field tolerance during the low-density stage of plasma ramp-up is approximately ~1×10^{−5} on the 2/1 resonant surface. In the reference ramp-up scenario, the q=2 surface appears at approximately 17 seconds. At later times, the error field can approach the critical tolerance; the analysis identifies approximately 30 kA·turns of correction-coil demand in a worst-case scenario involving a 1 cm displacement or 0.1° tilt of the central-solenoid and poloidal-field coils in the same direction. The available correction-coil capacity of approximately 400 kA·turns is therefore sufficient for the calculated worst-case requirement.

=== Plasma heating and current drive ===
BEST employs a multi-system auxiliary heating and current-drive programme combining neutral-beam injection (NBI) with several radio-frequency (RF) systems. The nominal auxiliary heating power is approximately 50 MW. The systems are intended not only to heat the plasma but also to control the plasma current profile, assist plasma initiation and ramp-up, modify plasma profiles, control magnetohydrodynamic activity and support long-pulse operation.

The electron-cyclotron range of frequency (ECRF) system is designed to provide up to 15 MW of RF power at 170 GHz for pulses exceeding 1,000 seconds. It uses 24 gyrotrons and transmits power through 24 actively water-cooled, evacuated corrugated circular waveguides to three equatorial launchers. The launchers can provide on-axis or off-axis electron heating and electron-cyclotron current drive. At toroidal fields between 5 and 6.15 T, simulations predict an electron-cyclotron current-drive efficiency of approximately 1.2 × 10⁻⁴ A/cm²/W.

The ion-cyclotron range of frequency (ICRF) system is initially designed to couple up to 10 MW over 40–65 MHz, while the RF plant has a total rated power of approximately 16 MW. The system is intended for ion heating, fast-particle control and plasma-profile modification. At the nominal 6.15 T field, candidate operating schemes include hydrogen-minority, helium-3-minority, deuterium-minority and three-ion heating scenarios.

BEST also incorporates a lower-hybrid (LH) system designed to provide 10 MW at 4.6 GHz for pulses exceeding 1,000 seconds. Two passive-active multijunction launchers are used to couple the lower-hybrid waves to the plasma. The LH system provides lower-hybrid current drive and can be used during plasma ramp-up to conserve central-solenoid flux and to modify the safety-factor profile. For a reference 7 MA Q ≥ 1 scenario, modelling predicts approximately 380–400 kA of driven current from 10 MW of LH power, depending on the plasma temperature profile.

The first-phase NBI system is designed to deliver approximately 12 MW of deuterium neutral-beam power from a single equatorial beamline using six 120-keV positive-ion sources. Later upgrades are planned to provide higher-energy neutral beams, including approximately 4 MW at 500 keV and eventually 10 MW at 800 keV using negative-ion sources. The different beam energies are intended to provide flexibility in plasma heating, current drive and energetic-particle studies.seconds.

BEST also incorporates fuelling and disruption-mitigation systems. Fuelling systems include gas injection, pellet injection, supersonic molecular-beam injection and compact-torus injection. For disruption mitigation, the design incorporates massive-gas-injection and shattered-pellet-injection systems capable of rapidly introducing radiating impurities or other material into the plasma to reduce the thermal and electromagnetic consequences of a disruption.

=== Plasma-facing components and exhaust ===
BEST is designed with a full-tungsten first wall and divertor to reproduce a plasma-facing environment relevant to future fusion reactors. The first wall comprises approximately 240 modules divided between high-heat-flux and normal-heat-flux components. The primary plasma-facing structure uses tungsten-coated copper components with CuCrZr heat sinks.

The first-wall heat sinks are actively cooled by water at a pressure of approximately 4 MPa and a temperature of approximately 70 °C. The heat-sink structures incorporate multiple slits to reduce thermal stresses and electromagnetic loads and are designed to permit remote maintenance and replacement.

The divertor is an actively water-cooled system consisting of 48 cassette assemblies. Each cassette weighs approximately 1.6 tonnes and covers 7.5° in the toroidal direction. The cassettes incorporate inner and outer vertical targets, dome structures and cassette bodies. The divertor is designed to remove heat and helium ash from the plasma while limiting erosion and impurity influx into the core plasma.

The plasma-facing components are designed for high heat-flux operation. W/Cu divertor components developed at the Institute of Plasma Physics, Chinese Academy of Sciences (ASIPP) it's heat loads of up to approximately 10 MW/m², while the most highly exposed flat-type and monoblock components are designed for heat loads of up to approximately 15 MW/m².

The divertor design incorporates advanced exhaust concepts, including configurations intended to facilitate detached or quasi-continuous-exhaust operation and reduce transient heat loads associated with edge-localized modes (ELMs).

Because BEST will operate with a tungsten plasma-facing environment, tungsten impurity transport is an important part of its plasma-control strategy. Excessive tungsten accumulation in the core can increase radiative losses and lead to degradation of plasma confinement or radiative collapse. The BEST research programme therefore includes tungsten-impurity control, divertor detachment, ELM mitigation and small- or no-ELM operating regimes.

During D–T operation, plasma-facing components are intended to be maintained and replaced using remote-handling systems because of neutron activation and the resulting radiological environment.

=== Blanket and neutron shielding ===
BEST incorporates provisions for testing breeding-blanket and nuclear technologies under D–T fusion conditions. The machine has three dedicated equatorial ports for Test Blanket Modules (TBMs), each providing a test area of approximately 0.6 × 1 m². The ports are intended to accommodate different blanket concepts together with their associated cooling, nuclear measurement, tritium extraction, accountancy, control and data-acquisition systems.

The BEST programme includes testing of several blanket concepts. ASIPP plans to test TBMs based on the CO₂-cooled lithium-lead (COOL) and water-cooled ceramic breeder (WCCB).

The TBM programme is intended to investigate the integrity and reliability of blanket modules under normal and accidental conditions, tritium production and extraction, nuclear interactions, high-temperature heat removal and high-grade heat extraction. It will also provide experimental data for validating neutronics, electromagnetic, thermal-hydraulic, tritium-transport and structural models.

During D–T operation, the 14.1-MeV neutrons produced by the fusion reactions will pass through the plasma-facing structures and interact with the blanket, shielding and structural materials. BEST is therefore designed to provide a neutron environment suitable for testing materials and fusion components while protecting the superconducting magnet system and other sensitive equipment.

The expected neutron wall loading ranges from approximately 0.05–0.1 MW/m² during long-pulse operation at fusion powers of about 10–20 MW to more than 0.4 MW/m² during high-power operation above 100 MW. Although the neutron fluence is insufficient for complete demonstration of a self-sufficient reactor blanket, BEST is intended to provide intermediate experimental validation of blanket integrity, tritium production, tritium extraction and heat-removal technologies.

=== Fuel-cycle systems ===
BEST includes a dedicated tritium fuel-cycle system intended to demonstrate the handling, monitoring, recovery and recycling of tritium during long-pulse D–T operation. The initial licensed on-site tritium inventory is planned to be up to approximately 110 g. Unlike a future self-sufficient fusion power reactor, BEST will rely on an external tritium supply; its blanket systems are instead intended to serve as experimental platforms for developing and validating tritium-breeding technologies.

The fuel-cycle programme covers tritium fuelling, inventory monitoring, removal, recovery, accountancy and direct internal recycling. The direct internal recycling system is intended to reduce the need for continuous external fuel processing by recovering fuel from the exhaust and returning it to the plasma-fuelling cycle.

The TBM systems provide an additional route for studying the fuel cycle. Tritium produced in breeding materials must be extracted from the blanket, separated from carrier gases or liquid breeders, measured and transferred back toward the fuel-processing system.

For solid breeder systems, the Research Plan considers helium purge-gas extraction followed by hydrogen-isotope separation and storage systems. For liquid-metal breeder systems, possible approaches include vacuum permeation, gas–liquid contactors and vacuum-sieve systems.

Tritium accountancy is an important part of the system because the total tritium inventory must be monitored for both operational control and nuclear safety. The planned systems include measurements of tritium in different process streams, recovery-system performance, inventories retained in structural and process materials, and potential losses through permeation.

BEST will also test detritiation and confinement technologies for tritium-containing systems. These technologies are intended to demonstrate reliable removal of tritium from contaminated equipment and atmospheres and to provide experience relevant to the safety and licensing requirements of future D–T fusion facilities.

The fuel-cycle programme is therefore intended to provide an integrated experimental chain extending from tritium production in breeding modules, through extraction and accountancy, to fuel processing, injection, plasma consumption and recycling. The results are intended to support the development of the tritium fuel cycle and breeding systems required for CFEDR and subsequent fusion power plants.

== See also ==
- Experimental Advanced Superconducting Tokamak (EAST)
- China Fusion Engineering Test Reactor (CFETR)
- Nuclear power in China
