= Plasma Physics Laboratory (Saskatchewan) =

Physics laboratory at the University of Saskatchewan

The Plasma Physics Laboratory at the University of Saskatchewan was established in 1959 by H. M. Skarsgard. Early work centered on research with a Betatron.

== Facilities ==
=== STOR-1M ===
STOR-1M is Canada's first tokamak built in 1983. In 1987 STOR-1M was the world’s first demonstration of alternating current in a tokamak.

=== STOR-M ===
STOR-M
Saskatchewan Torus-Modified
- Device type: Tokamak
- Location: Saskatchewan, Canada
- Affiliation: University of Saskatchewan

Technical specifications
- Major radius: 46 cm (18 in)
- Minor radius: 12.5 cm (4.9 in)
- Magnetic field: 0.5–1 T (5,000–10,000 G)
- Plasma current: 30–60 kA

History
- Year(s) of operation: 1987–present
- Preceded by: STOR-1M

STOR-M stands for Saskatchewan Torus-Modified. STOR-M is a tokamak located at the University of Saskatchewan. STOR-M is a small tokamak (major radius = 46 cm, minor radius = 12.5 cm) designed for studying plasma heating, anomalous transport and developing novel tokamak operation modes and advanced diagnostics. STOR-M is capable of a 30–40 millisecond plasma discharge with a toroidal magnetic field of between 0.5 and 1 tesla and a plasma current of between 20 and 50 kiloamperes. STOR-M has also demonstrated improved confinement induced by a turbulent heating pulse, electrode biasing and compact torus injection.
