= MAGPIE =

Pulsed power generator in London, England

MAGPIE (Mega Ampere Generator for Plasma Implosion Experiments) is a pulsed power generator based at Imperial College London, United Kingdom. The generator was originally designed to produce a current pulse with a maximum of 1.8 million amperes in 240 nanoseconds (150 nanoseconds rise time). At present the machine is operated with a maximum current of approximately 1.4 million amperes and operates as a z-pinch facility.

The generator consists of four voltage multipliers (Marx generators), each one containing 24 capacitors. At the maximum charging voltage of 100 kilo-volts, an output voltage of 2.4 million volts is produced and delivered into the load section. The pulses have a rise time of 150 ns and can be delivered in a high impedance load through a 1.25 Ω final line impedance.

Research at the MAGPIE generator has focused in the past on the field of inertial confinement fusion, but has recently seen significant adaptations for studies of Laboratory Astrophysics. In particular, the study of astrophysical jets in young stellar objects (see Herbig–Haro object) has been motivated by improved observational capabilities in the recent years. The simulation of such large-scale events has been undertaken at MAGPIE both from a computational point of view, through the GORGON code, and from an experimental one by means of the generator.

MAGPIE is one of several similar pulsed power machines worldwide, of which the largest and most powerful is the Z-machine at Sandia National Laboratories, Albuquerque, New Mexico.
