= HL-2M =

Tokamak in China

Huan-Liuqi-2M
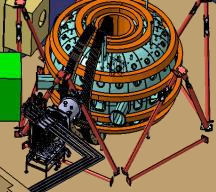
- CAD drawing of HL-2M
- Device type: Tokamak
- Location: Chengdu, Sichuan, China
- Affiliation: China National Nuclear Corporation, Southwestern Institute of Physics

Technical specifications
- Major radius: 1.78 m (5 ft 10 in)
- Minor radius: 0.65 m (2 ft 2 in)
- Magnetic field: 2.2 T (22,000 G)
- Heating power: 25 MW
- Discharge duration: 10 s
- Plasma current: 3 MA
- Plasma temperature: 200×10^{6} K

History
- Year(s) of operation: 2020–present
- Preceded by: HL-2A

HL-2M or HL-3 is a research tokamak at the Southwestern Institute of Physics in Chengdu, China. It was completed on November 26, 2019 and commissioned on December 4, 2020. HL-2M is now used for nuclear fusion research, in particular to study heat extraction from the plasma. With a major radius of 1.78 m, the tokamak is a medium-scale device. The magnetic field of up to 2.2 T is created by non-superconducting copper coils.
