= ASDEX Upgrade =

German tokamak

Axially Symmetric Divertor Experiment Upgrade
- Device type: Tokamak
- Location: Garching, Bavaria, Germany
- Affiliation: Max Planck Institute for Plasma Physics

Technical specifications
- Major radius: 1.65 m (5 ft 5 in)
- Minor radius: 0.5–0.8 m (1 ft 8 in – 2 ft 7 in)
- Plasma volume: 13 m^{3}
- Magnetic field: 3.1 T (31,000 G) (toroidal)
- Heating power: 27 MW
- Discharge duration: 10 s (pulse)
- Plasma current: 2 MA

History
- Year(s) of operation: 1991–present
- Preceded by: ASDEX

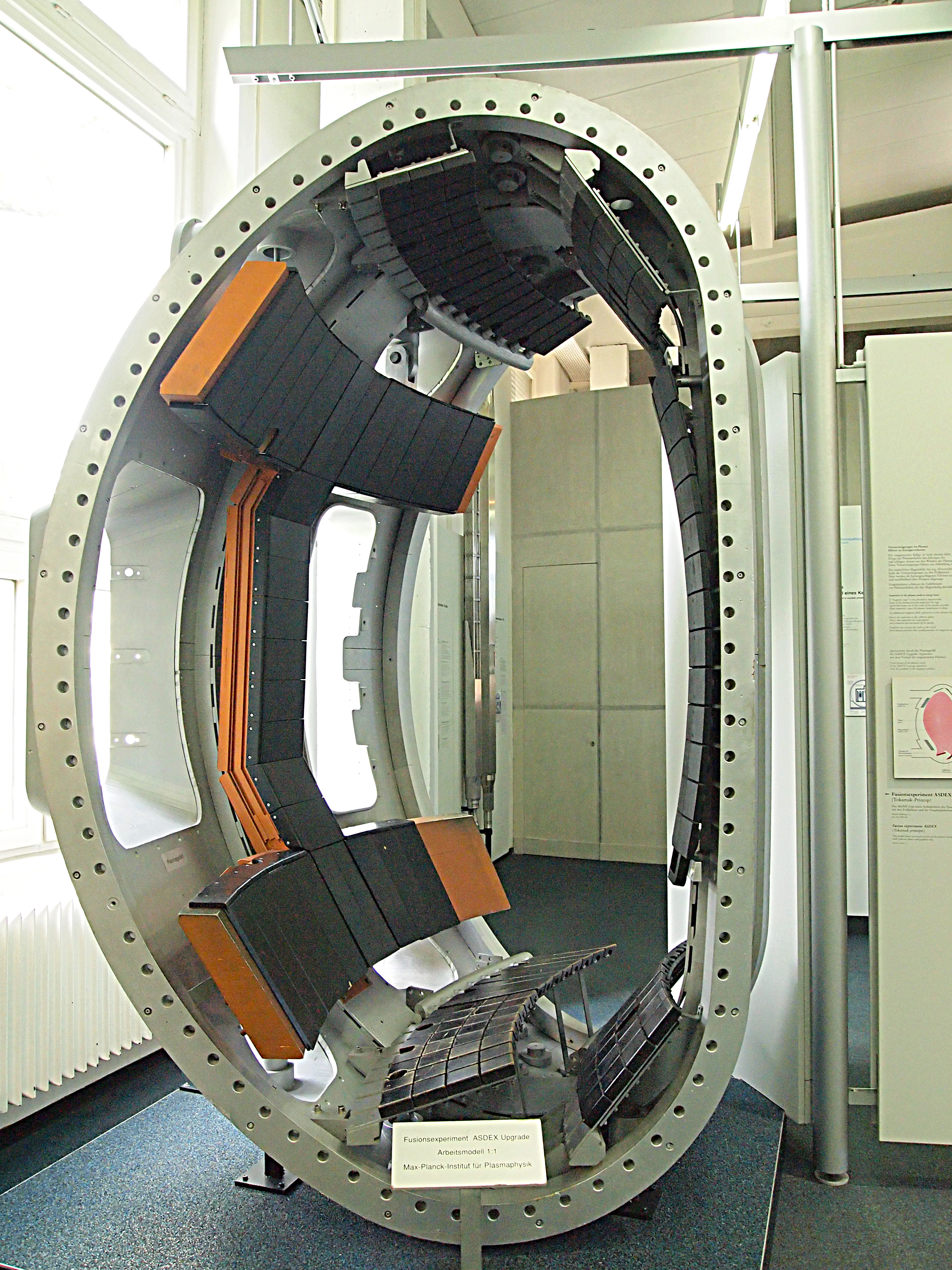
ASDEX Upgrade model

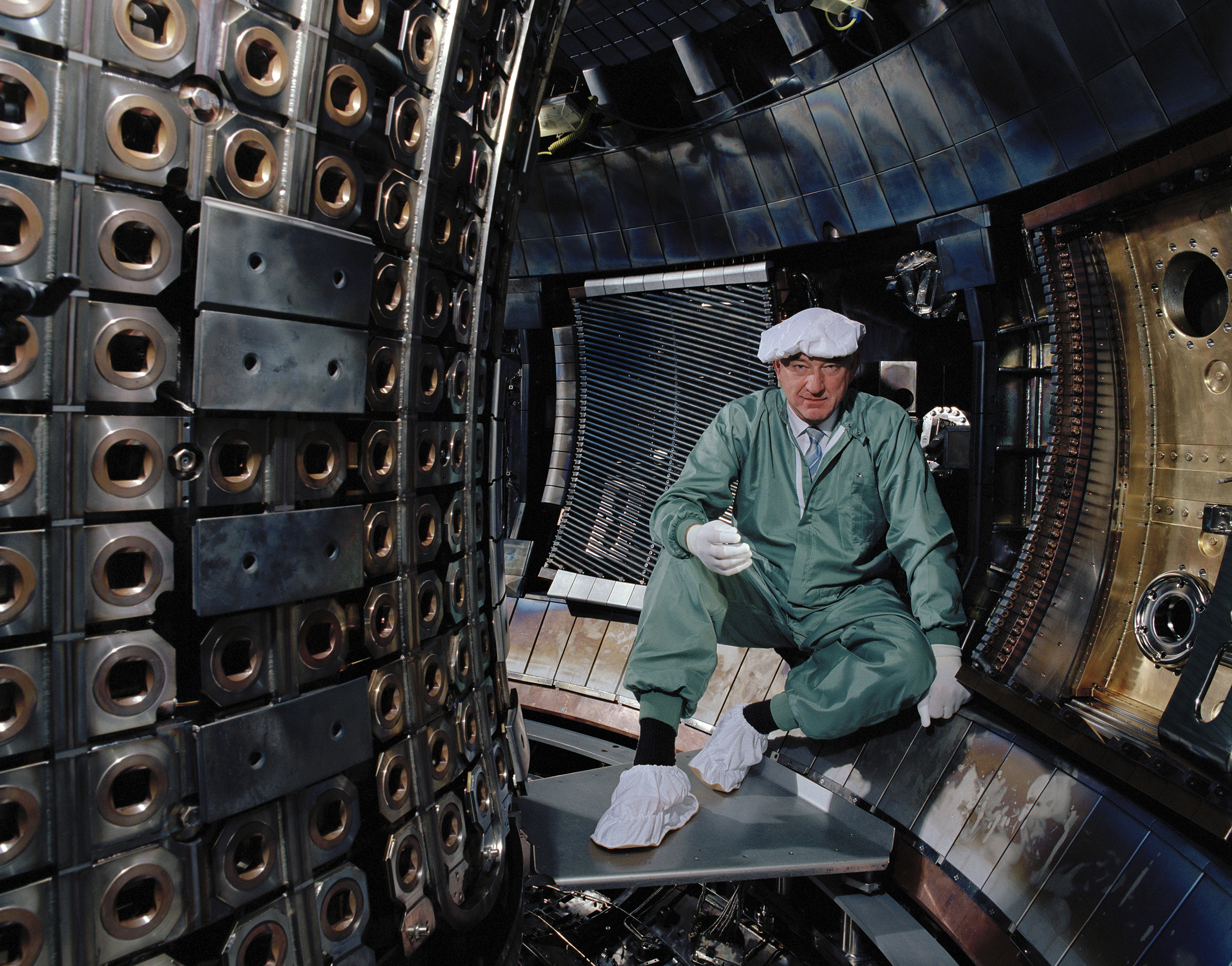
Physicist Alexander Bradshaw photographed by Oliver Mark in the ASDEX Upgrade, Garching 2006

ASDEX Upgrade (Axially Symmetric Divertor Experiment) is a divertor tokamak at the Max-Planck-Institut für Plasmaphysik, Garching that went into operation in 1991. At present, it is Germany's second largest fusion experiment after stellarator Wendelstein 7-X.

== Overview ==
To make experiments under reactor-like conditions possible, essential plasma properties, particularly the plasma density and pressure and the wall load, have been adapted in ASDEX Upgrade to the conditions that will be present in a future fusion power plant.

ASDEX Upgrade runs Deuterium - Deuterium plasma.

ASDEX Upgrade is, compared to other international tokamaks, a midsize tokamak experiment. It began operation in 1991 and it succeeds the ASDEX experiment, which was in operation from 1980 until 1990.

One innovative feature of the ASDEX Upgrade experiment is its all-tungsten first wall; tungsten is a good choice for the first wall of a tokamak because of its very high melting point (over 3000 degrees Celsius) which enables it to stand up to the very high heat fluxes emanating from the hot plasma at the heart of the tokamak; however there are also problems associated with a tungsten first wall, such as tungsten's tendency to ionise at high temperatures, "polluting" the plasma and diluting the deuterium-tritium fuel mix. Furthermore, as a high Z material, radiation from fully ionized tungsten in the plasma is several orders of magnitude higher than that of other proposed first wall components such as carbon fibre composites (CFCs) or beryllium. This result allows for far less tungsten to "contaminate" a proposed break-even plasma. ASDEX Upgrade will examine ways to overcome this problem, in preparation for the construction of ITER's first wall.

The experiment has an overall radius of 5 metres, a gross weight of 800 metric tons, a maximum magnetic field strength of 3.1 tesla, a maximum plasma current of 1.6 megaampere and maximum heating power of up to 27 megawatt. Plasma heating and current drive in the ASDEX Upgrade is derived from several sources, namely 1 MW of ohmic heating, 20 MW of neutral beam injection, 6 MW via ion cyclotron resonance heating (ICRH) at frequencies between 30 and 120 megahertz, and 2 x 2 MW of electron cyclotron resonance heating (ECRH) at 140 gigahertz. It has 16 toroidal field coils and 12 poloidal field coils.

Three large flywheel generators feed the 580 MVA pulsed power supply system for the magnetic confinement and plasma heating.

== ASDEX ==
ASDEX (with a major radius R=1.65m, minor radius a=0.4m, and plasma current Ip≤500kA) started operation in 1980. In 1991, it was dismantled by personnel of the Southwestern Institute of Physics (SWIP), transported to Chengdu, China, and its main components were used to build the HL-2A.

The H-mode was discovered in ASDEX in 1982.

== See also ==
- List of fusion experiments
- Edge-localized mode
- Ball-pen probe
