= HL-2A =

Tokamak in China

Huan-Liuqi-2A
- Device type: Tokamak
- Location: Chengdu, Sichuan, China
- Affiliation: China National Nuclear Corporation, Southwestern Institute of Physics

Technical specifications
- Major radius: 1.65 m (5 ft 5 in)
- Minor radius: 0.4 m (1 ft 4 in)
- Magnetic field: 2.8 T (28,000 G)
- Heating power: 11 MW
- Discharge duration: 5 s
- Plasma current: 0.48 MA

History
- Date(s) of construction: 1999
- Year(s) of operation: 2002–present
- Succeeded by: HL-2M

HL-2A (Huan-Liuqi-2A) is a medium-sized tokamak for fusion research in Chengdu, China. It was constructed by the China National Nuclear Corporation from early 1999 to 2002, based on the main components (magnet coils and plasma vessel) of the former German ASDEX device. HL-2A was the first tokamak with a divertor in China. The research goals of HL-2A are the study of fundamental fusion plasma physics to support the international ITER fusion reactor.
