= Plasma shaping =

Magnetically confined fusion plasmas such as those generated in tokamaks and stellarators are characterized by a typical shape. Plasma shaping is the study of the plasma shape in such devices, and is particularly important for next step fusion devices such as ITER. This shape is conditioning partly the performance of the plasma. Tokamaks, in particular, are axisymmetric devices, and therefore one can completely define the shape of the plasma by its cross-section.

== History ==
Early fusion reactor designs tended to have circular cross-sections simply because they were easy to design and understand. Generally, fusion machines using a toroidal layout, like the tokamak and most stellarators, arrange their magnetic fields so the ions and electrons in the plasma travel around the torus at high velocities. However, as the circumference of a path on the outside of the plasma area is longer than one on the inside, this caused several effects that disrupted the stability of the plasma.

During the 1960s a number of different methods were used to try to address these problems. Generally they used a combination of several magnetic fields to cause the net magnetic field inside the device to be twisted into a helix. Ions and electrons following these lines found themselves moving to the inside and then outside of the plasma, mixing it and suppressing some of the most obvious instabilities.

In the 1980s, further research along these lines demonstrated that further advances were possible by using external current-carrying coils to make the lines not just helical, but non-symmetric as well. This led to a series of experiments using C and D-shaped plasma volumes..

By increasing the current in one (or more) shaping coils to a high enough degree, one (or more) 'X-points' can be created. An X-point is defined as a point in space at which the poloidal field has zero magnitude. The magnetic flux surface that intersects with the X-point is called the separatrix, and, as all flux surfaces external to this surface are unconfined, the separatrix defines the last closed flux surface (LCFS). Formerly, the LCFS was established by inserting a material limiter into the plasma, which fixed the plasma temperature and potential (among other quantities) to be equal to that of the limiter. Plasma that escaped the LCFS would do so with no preferential direction, potentially damaging instruments. By establishing an X-point and separatrix, the plasma edge is uncoupled from the vessel walls, and exhausted heat and plasma particles are preferentially diverted towards a known region of the vessel near the X-point.

== Cross-section ==
In the simple case of a plasma with up-down symmetry, the plasma cross-section is defined using a combination of four parameters:

- the plasma elongation, $\kappa={b \over a}$, where $a$ is the plasma minor radius, and $b$ is the height of the plasma measured from the equatorial plane,
- the plasma triangularity, $\delta$, defined as the horizontal distance between the plasma major radius $R$ and the X point,
- the angle between the horizontal and the plasma last closed flux surface (LCFS) at the low field side,
- the angle between the horizontal and the plasma last closed flux surface (LCFS) at the high field side.

In general (no up-down symmetry), there can be an upper-triangularity, and a lower-triangularity.

Tokamaks can have negative triangularity.
