= Compact Toroidal Hybrid =

Alabama stellarator

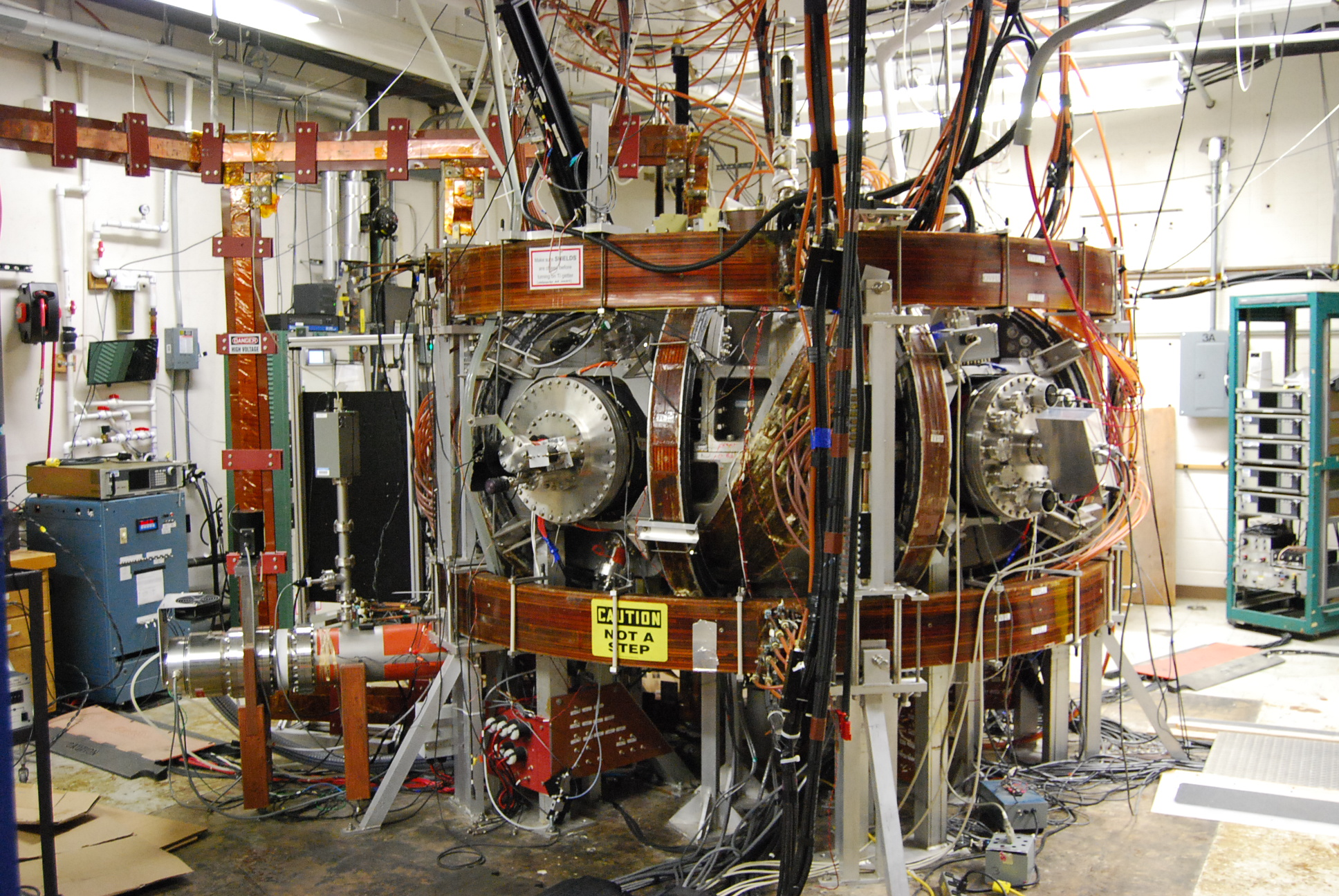
- Device type: Stellarator
- Location: Alabama, United States
- Affiliation: Auburn University

Technical specifications
- Major radius: 0.75 m (2 ft 6 in)
- Minor radius: 0.29 m (11 in)
- Plasma volume: 0.6 m^{3}
- Magnetic field: 0.4–0.7 T (4,000–7,000 G)
- Heating power: 10 kW (ECH); 100 kW (ohmic)

History
- Year(s) of operation: 2005–present
- Preceded by: Compact Auburn Torsatron

The Compact Toroidal Hybrid (CTH) is an experimental device at Auburn University that uses magnetic fields to confine high-temperature plasmas. CTH is a torsatron type of stellarator with an external, continuously wound helical coil that generates the bulk of the magnetic field for containing a plasma.

== Background ==
Toroidal magnetic confinement fusion devices create magnetic fields that lie in a torus. These magnetic fields consist of two components, one component points in the direction that goes the long way around the torus (the toroidal direction), while the other component points in the direction that is the short way around the torus (the poloidal direction). The combination of the two components creates a helically shaped field. (You might imagine taking a flexible stick of candy cane and connecting the two ends.) Stellarator type devices generate all required magnetic fields with external magnetic coils. This is different from tokamak devices where the toroidal magnetic field is generated by external coils and the poloidal magnetic field is produced by an electrical current flowing through the plasma.

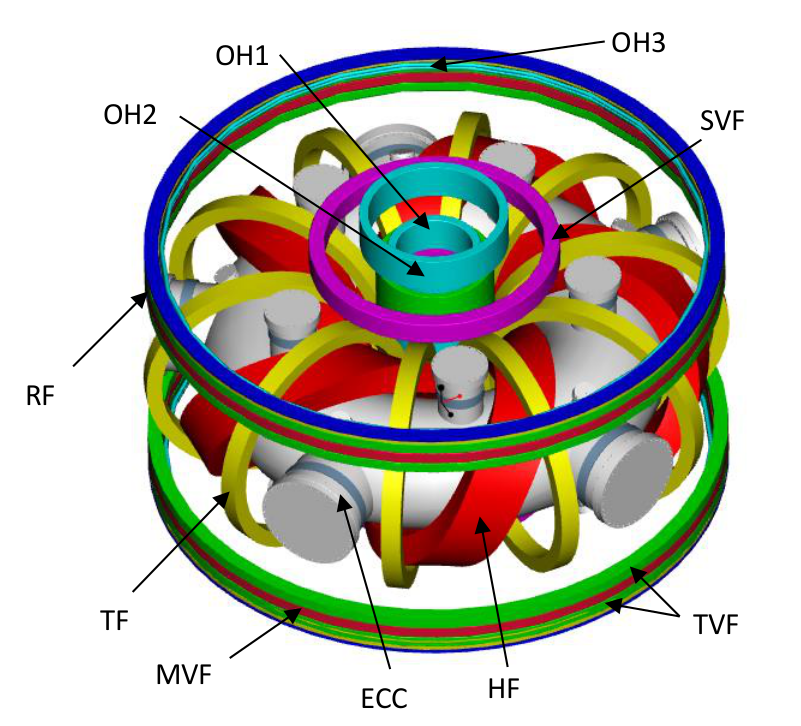
A drawing showing the CTH vacuum vessel (shown in grey) and magnetic field coils.HF(red) - Helical Field, TF - Toroidal Field, OH1,2,3 - Ohmic Transformer Coils, MVF - Main Vertical Field, TVF - Trim Vertical Field, SVF - Shaping Vertical Field, RF - Radial Field, EF, Equilibrium Field, ECC - Error Correction Coil

== The CTH device ==
The main magnetic field in CTH is generated by a continuously wound helical coil. An auxiliary set of ten coils produces a toroidal field much like that of a tokamak. This toroidal field is used to vary the rotational transform of the confining magnetic field structure. CTH typically operates at a magnetic field of 0.5 to 0.6 tesla at the center of the plasma. CTH can be operated as a pure stellarator, but also has ohmic heating transformer system to drive electrical current in the plasma. This current produces a poloidal magnetic field that, in addition to heating the plasma, changes the rotational transform of the magnetic field. CTH researchers study how well the plasma is confined while they vary the source of rotational transform from external coils to plasma current.

The CTH vacuum vessel is made of Inconel 625, which has a higher electrical resistance and lower magnetic permeability than stainless steel. Plasma formation and heating is achieved using 14 GHz, 10 kW electron cyclotron resonance heating (ECRH). A 200 kW gyrotron has recently been installed on CTH. Ohmic heating on CTH has an input power of 100 kW.

=== Operations ===
- Plasmas electron temperatures are typically up to 200 electronvolts with electron densities up to 5×10^{19} m^{−3}.
- Plasmas last between 60 ms and 100 ms
- It takes 6 min-7 min to store enough energy to power the magnet coils

=== Subsystems ===
The following gives a list of subsystems needed for CTH operation.

- a set of 10 GE752 motors with attached 1-ton flywheels to store energy and produce currents for magnetic field generation
- two 18 GHz klystrons for Electron cyclotron resonance heating
- gyrotron for 2nd harmonic Electron cyclotron resonance heating
- a 2 kV, 50 μF capacitor bank and a 1 kV, 3 F capacitor bank to power the ohmic system
- a 640 channel data acquisition system

=== Diagnostics ===
The CTH has a large set of diagnostics to measure properties of plasma and magnetic fields. The following gives a list of major diagnostics.

- 4-channel Interferometer for electron density measurements
- two color soft-X-ray camera for tomography and temperature profile
- soft x-ray spectrometer
- hard x-ray detector
- Coils for measuring Mirnov oscillations in the plasma
- Rogowski coils for determining plasma current
- Passive spectroscopy for temperature and density measurements, and tungsten erosion diagnostic measurements
- Langmuir probe (triple)

=== V3FIT ===
Last closed magnetic flux surfaces as reconstructed by the V3FIT code without (left) and with (right) plasma current. The coloration depicts the strength of the magnetic field with red being the strongest field and blue being the weakest. Sample field lines are shown in white.

V3FIT is a code to reconstruct the equilibrium between the plasma and confining magnetic field in cases where the magnetic field is toroidal in nature, but not axisymmetric as is the case with tokamak equilibria. Because stellarators are non-axisymmetric, the CTH group uses the V3FIT and VMEC codes for reconstructing equilibria. The V3FIT code uses as inputs the currents in the magnetic confinement coils, the plasma current, and data from the various diagnostics such as the Rogowski coils, SXR cameras, and interferometer. The output of the V3FIT code includes the structure of the magnetic field, and profiles of the plasma current, density, and SXR emissivity. Data from the CTH experiment was and continues to be used as a testbed for the V3FIT code which has also used for equilibrium reconstruction on the Helically Symmetric eXperiment (HSX), Large Helical Device (LHD), and Wendelstein 7-X (W7-X) stellarators, and the Reversed-Field eXperiment (RFX) and Madison Symmetric Torus (MST) reversed field pinches.

== Goals and major achievements ==
CTH has made and continues to make fundamental contributions to the physics of current carrying stellarators. CTH researchers have studied disruption limits and characterizations as a function of the externally applied rotational transform (due to external magnet coils) for:

- Low safety factor (low-q) tokamak-like disruption avoidance
- Vertical displacement events (VDEs)

== Ongoing experiments ==
CTH students and staff work on a number of experimental and computational research projects. Some of these are solely in house while others are in collaboration with other universities and national laboratories in the United States and abroad. Current research projects include:

- Density limit studies as a function of the vacuum rotational transform
- Using spectroscopic techniques to measure tungsten erosion with the DIII-D group
- Measuring plasma flows with a Coherence Imaging system on CTH and on the W-7X stellarator
- Heavy ion transport studies on the W-7X stellarator
- Studying transition regions between fully ionized and neutrally dominated plasmas
- Implementation of a 4th channel for the interferometer system
- 2nd harmonic electron cyclotron resonance heating with a gyrotron

== History ==
Auburn Torsatron
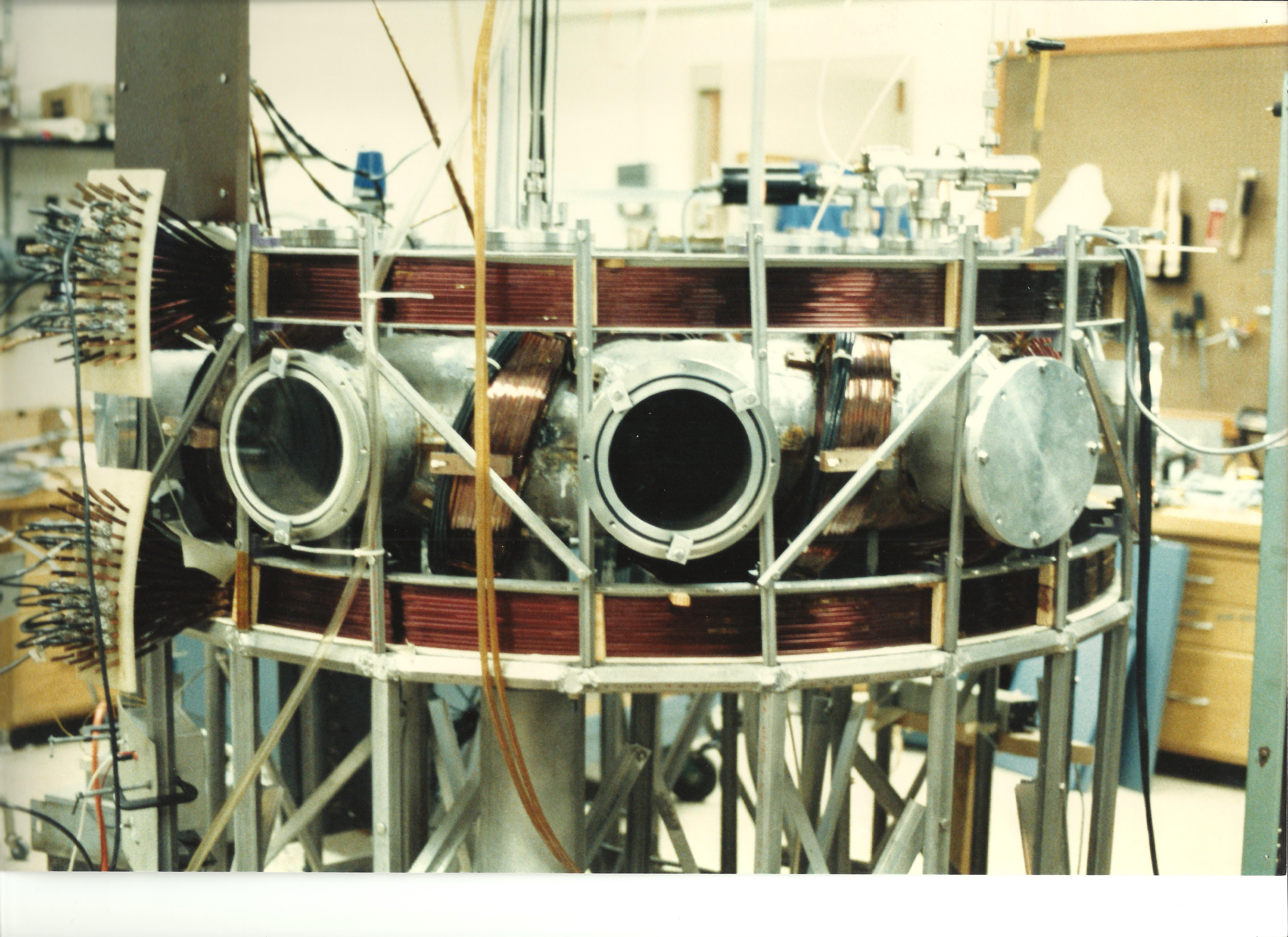
- Device type: Stellarator
- Location: Alabama, United States
- Affiliation: Auburn University

Technical specifications
- Major radius: 0.58 m (1 ft 11 in)
- Minor radius: 0.14 m (5.5 in)
- Magnetic field: < 0.2 T (2,000 G)

History
- Year(s) of operation: 1983–1990
- Succeeded by: Compact Auburn Torsatron

Compact Auburn Torsatron
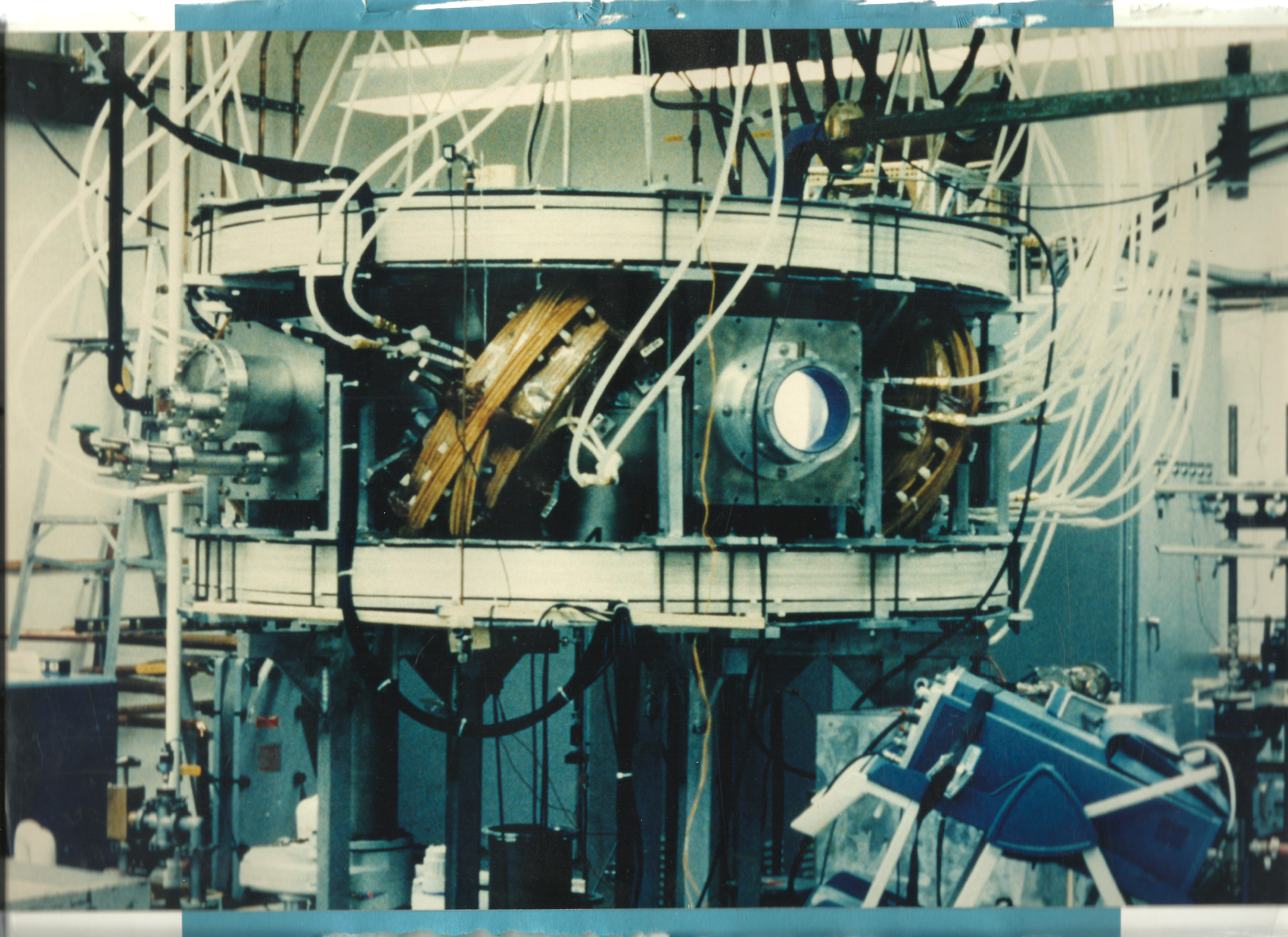
- Device type: Stellarator
- Location: Alabama, United States
- Affiliation: Auburn University

Technical specifications
- Major radius: 0.53 m (1 ft 9 in)
- Minor radius: 0.11 m (4.3 in)
- Plasma volume: 0.12 m^{3}
- Magnetic field: 0.1 T (1,000 G)

History
- Year(s) of operation: 1990–2000
- Preceded by: Auburn Torsatron
- Succeeded by: Compact Toroidal Hybrid

CTH is the third torsatron device to be built at Auburn University. Previous Magnetic Confinement Devices built at the university were:

=== The Auburn Torsatron (1983–1990) ===
The Auburn Torsatron had an l=2, m=10 helical coil. The vacuum vessel had a major radius was R_{o} = 0.58 m with a minor radius of a_{v}=0.14 m. The magnetic field strength was |B| ≤ 0.2 T and plasmas were formed with ECRH using a 2.45 GHz magnetron taken from a microwave oven. The Auburn Torsatron was used to study basic plasma physics and diagnostics, and magnetic surface mapping techniques

=== The Compact Auburn Torsatron (1990–2000) ===
The Compact Auburn Torsatron (CAT) had two helical coils, an l=1,m=5 and an l=2,m=5 whose currents could be controlled independently. Varying the relative currents between the helical coils modified the rotational transform. The vacuum vessel major radius was R_{o} = 0.53 m with a plasma minor radius of a_{v}=0.11 m. The steady state magnetic field strength was |B| 0.1 T. CAT plasmas were formed with ECRH using a low ripple, 6 kW, 2.45 GHz magnetron source. CAT was used to study magnetic islands, magnetic island minimization, and driven plasma rotations

== Other Stellarators ==
Below is a list of other Stellarators in the US and around the world:

- Wendelstein 7-X in Greifswald Germany
- The Large Helical Device (LDH) in Japan
- The National Compact Stellarator Experiment (NCSX) - A device designed and partially built at Princeton Plasma Physics Laboratory (PPPL)
- The Helically Symmetric Experiment at the University of Wisconsin - Madison
- The Hybrid Illinois Device for Research and Applications (HIDRA) experiment at the University of Illinois
- The Columbia Non-neutral Torus (CNT) at Columbia University in New York
- The Heliotron J experiment in Japan
- The TJ-II in Spain
- The Stellarator of Costa Rica (SCR-1)
- Uragan-2M in Ukraine
