= Bohm diffusion =

Physical phenomenon

The diffusion of plasma across a magnetic field was conjectured to follow the Bohm diffusion scaling as indicated from the early plasma experiments of very lossy machines. This predicted that the rate of diffusion was linear with temperature ($D \propto T$) and inversely linear with the strength of the confining magnetic field ($D \propto B^{-1}$).

The rate predicted by Bohm diffusion is much higher than the rate predicted by classical diffusion, which develops from a random walk within the plasma. The classical model scaled inversely with the square of the magnetic field. If the classical model is correct, small increases in the field lead to much longer confinement times. If the Bohm model is correct, magnetically confined fusion would not be practical.

Early fusion energy machines appeared to behave according to Bohm's model, and by the 1960s there was a significant stagnation within the field. The introduction of the tokamak in 1968 was the first evidence that the Bohm model did not hold for all machines. Bohm predicts rates that are too fast for these machines, and classical too slow; studying these machines has led to the neoclassical diffusion concept.

== Description ==
Bohm diffusion is characterized by a diffusion coefficient equal to
$$D_\text{Bohm} = \frac{1}{16} \, \frac{k_\text{B} T}{e B},$$
where B is the magnetic field strength, T is the electron gas temperature, e is the elementary charge, k_{B} is the Boltzmann constant.

It was first observed in 1949 by David Bohm, E. H. S. Burhop, and Harrie Massey while studying magnetic arcs for use in isotope separation. It has since been observed that many other plasmas follow this law. Fortunately there are exceptions where the diffusion rate is lower, otherwise there would be no hope of achieving practical fusion energy. In Bohm's original work he notes that the fraction 1/16 is not exact; in particular "the exact value of [the diffusion coefficient] is uncertain within a factor of 2 or 3." Lyman Spitzer considered this fraction as a factor related to plasma instability.

== Approximate derivation ==
Generally diffusion can be modeled as a random walk of steps of length $\delta$ and time $\tau$. If the diffusion is collisional, then $\delta$ is the mean free path and $\tau$ is the inverse of the collision frequency. The diffusion coefficient D can be expressed variously as

$$D = \frac{\delta^2}{\tau} = v^2 \tau = \delta\,v,$$

where $v = \delta/\tau$ is the velocity between collisions.

In a magnetized plasma, the collision frequency is usually small compared to the gyrofrequency, so that the step size is the gyroradius $\rho$ and the step time is the collision time, $\tau$, which is related to the collision frequency through $\tau = 1 / \nu$, leading to $D = \rho^2 \nu \propto B^{-2}$ (classical diffusion).

On the other hand, if the collision frequency is larger than the gyrofrequency, then the particles can be considered to move freely with the thermal velocity v_{th} between collisions, and the diffusion coefficient takes the form $D = v_\text{th}^2/\nu$. In this regime, the diffusion is maximum when the collision frequency is equal to the gyrofrequency, in which case $D = \rho^2 \omega_\text{c} = v_\text{th}^2 / \omega_\text{c}$. Substituting $\rho = v_\text{th} / \omega_\text{c}$, $v_\text{th} = (k_\text{B}T/m)^{1/2}$, and $\omega_\text{c} = e B / m$ (the cyclotron frequency), we arrive at
$$D = k_\text{B} T / e B ,$$
which is the Bohm scaling. Considering the approximate nature of this derivation, the missing 1/16 in front is no cause for concern.

Bohm diffusion is typically greater than classical diffusion. The fact that classical diffusion and Bohm diffusion scale as different powers of the magnetic field is often used to distinguish between the two.

== Further research ==
In light of the calculation above, it is tempting to think of Bohm diffusion as classical diffusion with an anomalous collision rate that maximizes the transport, but the physical picture is different. Anomalous diffusion is the result of turbulence. Regions of higher or lower electric potential result in eddies because the plasma moves around them with the E-cross-B drift velocity equal to E/B. These eddies play a similar role to the gyro-orbits in classical diffusion, except that the physics of the turbulence can be such that the decorrelation time is approximately equal to the turn-over time, resulting in Bohm scaling. Another way of looking at it is that the turbulent electric field is approximately equal to the potential perturbation divided by the scale length $\delta$, and the potential perturbation can be expected to be a sizeable fraction of the k_{B}T/e. The turbulent diffusion constant $D = v \delta$ is then independent of the scale length and is approximately equal to the Bohm value.

The theoretical understanding of plasma diffusion especially the Bohm diffusion remained elusive until the 1970s when Taylor and McNamara put forward a 2d guiding center plasma model. The concepts of negative temperature state, and of the convective cells contributed much to the understanding of the diffusion. The underlying physics may be explained as follows. The process can be a transport driven by the thermal fluctuations, corresponding to the lowest possible random electric fields. The low-frequency spectrum will cause the E×B drift. Due to the long range nature of Coulomb interaction, the wave coherence time is long enough to allow virtually free streaming of particles across the field lines. Thus, the transport would be the only mechanism to limit the run of its own course and to result in a self-correction by quenching the coherent transport through the diffusive damping. To quantify these statements, we may write down the diffusive damping time as
$$\tau_D = \frac{1}{k_{\perp}^2 D},$$
where k_{⊥} is the wave number perpendicular to the magnetic field. Therefore, the step size is $c \delta E \tau_D / B$, and the diffusion coefficient is

$$D = \left\langle \frac {\Delta x^2}{\tau_D}\right\rangle \sim \frac {c^2 \delta E^2}{B^2 k_{\perp}^2 D} \sim \frac {c \delta E}{Bk_{\perp}} .$$

It clearly yields for the diffusion a scaling law of B^{−1} for the two dimensional plasma. The thermal fluctuation is typically a small portion of the particle thermal energy. It is reduced by the plasma parameter
$$\varepsilon_\text{p} = \left(n_0\lambda_\text{D}^3\right)^{-1}\ll 1,$$
and is given by
$${\left|\delta E\right|}^2 \approx \varepsilon_\text{p} n_0 k_\text{B}T / \pi^{1/2} \approx 4\pi^{1/2} n_0 q^2 \lambda_\text{D}^{-1},$$
where n_{0} is the plasma density, λ_{D} is the Debye length, and T is the plasma temperature. Taking $k_{\perp}^{-1} \approx \lambda_\text{D}$ and substituting the electric field by the thermal energy, we would have
$$D \approx \frac{2 c q \pi^{1/4}}{B} {\left(\lambda_\text{D} n_0\right)}^{1/2} \approx \varepsilon_\text{p}^{1/2} \frac{c k_\text{B}T}{q B} / 2\pi^{3/4}.$$
The 2D plasma model becomes invalid when the parallel decoherence is significant. An effective diffusion mechanism combining effects from the E×B drift and the cyclotron resonance was proposed, predicting a scaling law of B^{−3/2}.

In 2015, new exact explanation for the original Bohm's experiment is reported, in which the cross-field diffusion measured at Bohm's experiment and Simon's experiment were explained by the combination of the ion gyro-center shift and the short circuit effect. The ion gyro-center shift occurs when an ion collides with a neutral to exchange the momentum; typical example is ion-neutral charge exchange reaction. The one directional shifts of gyro-centers take place when ions are in the perpendicular (to the magnetic field) drift motion such as diamagnetic drift. The electron gyro-center shift is relatively small since the electron gyro-radius is much smaller than ion's so it can be disregarded. Once ions move across the magnetic field by the gyro-center shift, this movement generates spontaneous electric unbalance between in and out of the plasma. However this electric unbalance is immediately compensated by the electron flow through the parallel path and conducting end wall, when the plasma is contained in the cylindrical structure as in Bohm's and Simon's experiments. Simon recognized this electron flow and named it as 'short circuit' effect in 1955. With the help of short circuit effect the ion flow induced by the diamagnetic drift now becomes whole plasma flux which is proportional to the density gradient since the diamagnetic drift includes pressure gradient. The diamagnetic drift can be described as $(k_\text{B}T/eB) (\boldsymbol{\nabla} n/n)$, (here n is density) for approximately constant temperature over the diffusion region. When the particle flux is proportional to $(k_\text{B} T /eB ) (\boldsymbol{\nabla} n/n)$, the other part than $\boldsymbol{\nabla} n/n$ is the diffusion coefficient. So naturally the diffusion is proportional to $k_\text{B}T/eB$. The other front coefficient of this diffusion is a function of the ratio between the charge exchange reaction rate and the gyro frequency. A careful analysis tells this front coefficient for Bohm's experiment was in the range of 1/13 ~ 1/40. The gyro-center shift analysis also reported the turbulence induced diffusion coefficient which is responsible for the anomalous diffusion in many fusion devices; described as $(2/\pi)(k_\text{B}T/eB)(\delta n/n)$. This means different two diffusion mechanisms (the arc discharge diffusion such as Bohm's experiment and the turbulence induced diffusion such as in the tokamak) have been called by the same name of "Bohm diffusion".

== See also ==
- Classical diffusion
- Plasma diffusion
