= Proxima Fusion =

Fusion energy company from Munich, Germany

- Industry: Fusion power
- Founded: April 2023; 3 years ago
- Founders: Francesco Sciortino; Lucio Milanese; Jorrit Lion; Jonathan Schilling; Martin Kubie
- Headquarters: Munich, Germany
- Number of employees: 90+ (2025)
- Website: www.proximafusion.com

Proxima Fusion is a European fusion energy company founded in 2023 in Munich, Germany, as the first research spin-off from the Max Planck Institute for Plasma Physics. Its stated goal is to design the first generation of fusion power plants using a quasi-isodynamic stellarator (QI stellarator).

== History ==
Proxima was founded in April 2023 by Francesco Sciortino, Lucio Milanese, Jorrit Lion, Jonathan Schilling, and Martin Kubie, former scientists and engineers from the Max Planck Institute for Plasma Physics, the Massachusetts Institute of Technology, and X Development (was Google-X).

The company initially raised €7.5 million in pre-seed funding from Plural Platform, UVC Partners, Visionaries Club, Wilbe, High-Tech Gründerfonds, and others, followed by a €20 million seed round led by redalpine, with participation from Bayern Kapital, DeepTech & Climate Fonds, and the Max Planck Foundation. It has since been awarded more public funding from the European Innovation Council (source) and the Federal Ministry of Education and Research (Germany).

On June 28, 2024, Proxima announced that it would partner with the Paul Scherrer Institute to develop high-temperature superconducting magnets for its stellarators.

In February 2025, Proxima presented a concept for a commercial fusion power plant named Stellaris. That concept has been compared in impact to the US ARC fusion reactor tokamak concept published in 2014. A smaller prototype stellarator aiming at net fusion energy is planned for 2031.

In June 2025, Proxima Fusion announced that they received €130 million in funding in a Series A round. In September 2025, they received an added €15M extension.

An investment round of July 2026 included Google parent company Alphabet Inc.

== Technology ==
Since 2015 the Max Planck Institute for Plasma Physics has operated the quasi-isodynamic stellarator Wendelstein 7-X. It follows in a series of Max Planck stellarators built and operated since 1960. The quasi-isodynamic feature was developed theoretically and in practical implementation in the 1980s by Allen Boozer and Jürgen Nührenberg, for which they were awarded the 2010 Hannes Alfvén Prize by the European Physical Society.

Max Planck developed a series of reactor design studies based on Wendelstein 7-X since the 1990s. Proxima Fusion's Stellaris design is substantially similar but with a higher magnetic field provided by recent developments in high temperature superconductors, and correspondingly a somewhat smaller size. In both Wendelstein 7-X and Stellaris, toroidal plasma current is optimized to cancel to near-zero, which is believed to contribute to stability and steady state operation.

== See also ==
- List of nuclear fusion companies
