= Piecewise omnigenity =

Property of the magnetic field of a magnetic confinement device

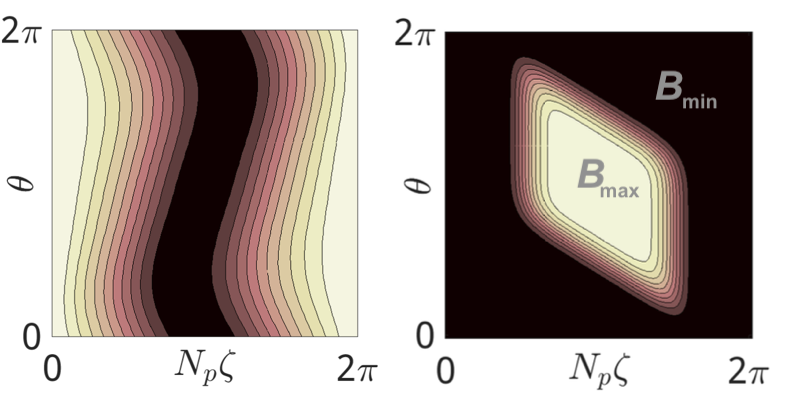
Variation of the magnetic field strength of an omnigenous field (left), and a piecewise omnigenous field. A darker color corresponds to a weaker field. The x and y axis are angles that label the flux surface.

Piecewise omnigeneity is a property of the magnetic field of a magnetic confinement device . It constitutes a generalization of the property of omnigenity. Similarly to what happens in an omnigenous field, in a piecewise omnigenous field a charged particle takes does not drift radially (inwards or outwards) on average, and is therefore confined to stay on a flux surface. As a consequence of this, a piecewise omnigenous field has tokamak-like neoclassical transport.

For decades, stellarator designs have been optimized to meet this criterion. Piecewise represents an alternative optimization target that may expand the space of magnetic fields relevant for reactor applications.

== Theory ==
The drifting of particles across flux surfaces is generally only a problem for trapped particles, which are trapped in a magnetic mirror. Passing particles, which can circulate freely around the flux surface, are automatically confined to stay on a flux surface. For trapped particles, omnigeneity and piecewise omnigenity relate closely to the second adiabatic invariant $\cal{J}$.

One can show that the radial drift a particle experiences after one full bounce motion is simply related to a derivative of $\cal{J}$,
$$\frac{\partial \cal{J}}{\partial \alpha} = q \Delta \psi$$
where $q$ is the charge of the particle, $\alpha$ is the magnetic field line label, and $\Delta \psi$ is the total radial drift expressed as a difference in toroidal flux. In a piecewise omnigenous field, the flux surface of the stellarator is composed of several regions; within each of them, the second adiabatic invariant should be the same for all the magnetic field lines, and thus
$$\frac{\partial \cal{J}}{\partial \alpha} = 0$$
inside each region. The junctures between regions can be shown not to cause neoclassical transport.
