= Omnigeneity =

Concept in stellarator physics

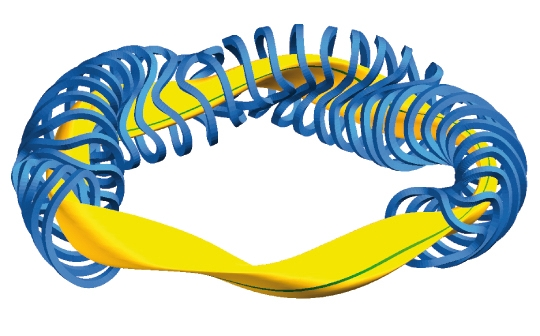
A flux surface of Wendelstein 7-X (yellow), a magnetic field line on that flux surface (green), and the coils needed to generate the magnetic field (blue). Wendelstein 7-X is designed to be nearly omnigenous.

Omnigeneity (sometimes also called omnigenity) is a property of a magnetic field inside a magnetic confinement fusion reactor. Such a magnetic field is called omnigenous if the path a single particle takes does not drift radially inwards or outwards on average. A particle is then confined to stay on a flux surface. All tokamaks are exactly omnigenous by virtue of their axisymmetry, and conversely an unoptimized stellarator is generally not omnigenous.

Because an exactly omnigenous reactor has no neoclassical transport (in the collisionless limit), stellarators are usually optimized in a way such that this criterion is met. One way to achieve this is by making the magnetic field quasi-symmetric, and the Helically Symmetric eXperiment takes this approach. One can also achieve this property without quasi-symmetry, and Wendelstein 7-X is an example of a device which is close to omnigeneity without being quasi-symmetric.

== Theory ==
The drifting of particles across flux surfaces is generally only a problem for trapped particles, which are trapped in a magnetic mirror. Untrapped (or passing) particles, which can circulate freely around the flux surface, are automatically confined to stay on a flux surface. For trapped particles, omnigeneity relates closely to the second adiabatic invariant $\cal{J}$ (often called the parallel or longitudinal invariant).

One can show that the radial drift a particle experiences after one full bounce motion is simply related to a derivative of $\cal{J}$,
$$\frac{\partial \cal{J}}{\partial \alpha} = q \Delta \psi$$
where $q$ is the charge of the particle, $\alpha$ is the magnetic field line label, and $\Delta \psi$ is the total radial drift expressed as a difference in toroidal flux. With this relation, omnigeneity can be expressed as the criterion that the second adiabatic invariant should be the same for all the magnetic field lines on a flux surface,
$$\frac{\partial \cal{J}}{\partial \alpha} = 0$$
This criterion is exactly met in axisymmetric systems, as the derivative with respect to $\alpha$ can be expressed as a derivative with respect to the toroidal angle (under which the system is invariant). In piecewise omnigenous fields, this criterion is met piecewisely on the flux surface.
