= Quasi-isodynamic stellarator =

Class of magnetic confinement fusion reactor

A quasi-isodynamic (QI) stellarator is a type of stellarator (a magnetic confinement fusion reactor) that satisfies the property of omnigeneity, avoids the potentially hazardous toroidal bootstrap current, and has minimal neoclassical transport in the collisionless regime.

This possibility was discovered as a mathematical theory by Allen Boozer in the 1980s. Wendelstein 7-X, the largest stellarator in the world, was designed to be roughly quasi-isodynamic (QI). The specific design was based on computational work of Jürgen Nührenberg. The stellarator began operation in 2015 and has successfully produced steady state plasmas with high temperatures and densities.

In contrast to quasi-symmetric fields, exactly QI fields on flux surfaces cannot be expressed analytically. However, it has been shown that nearly-exact QI can be extremely well approximated through mathematical optimization, and that the resulting fields enjoy the aforementioned properties.

In a QI field, level curves of the magnetic field strength $B$ on a flux surface close poloidally (the short way around the torus), and not toroidally (the long way around), causing the stellarator to resemble a series of linked magnetic mirrors.
