= Iván Vargas Blanco =

Costa Rican plasma and nuclear fusion physicist

- Víctor Iván Vargas Blanco
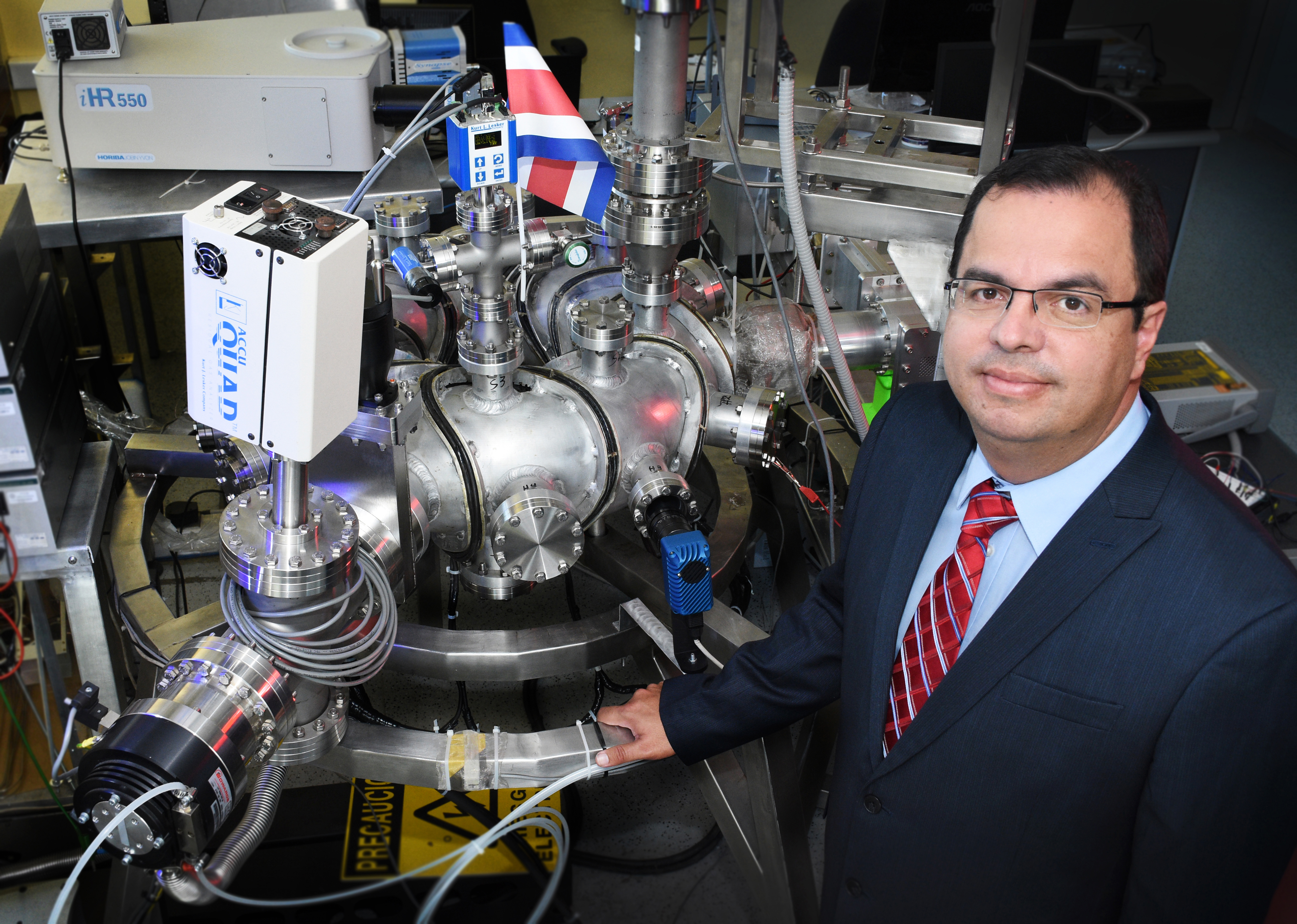
- Iván Vargas Blanco with the SCR-1 Stellarator. Photo: Ruth Garita, OCM-TEC.
- Born: March 24, 1973 (age 53); Alajuela, Costa Rica
- Occupations: Researcher, Professor
- Spouse: Yoslaidy Rivera Peña
- Children: 1
- Parent: Víctor Manuel Vargas Rodríguez Susana Blanco Solís
- Scientific career
- Education: University of Costa Rica (BS in Physics); Complutense University of Madrid (Master of Advanced Studies); Complutense University of Madrid (PhD)
- Awards: Clodomiro Picado Twight National Prize for Science and Technology (2016) Field: Technology
- Fields: Plasma Physics, Nuclear Fusion
- Workplaces: Costa Rica Institute of Technology
- Website: ivanvargas.net

Víctor Iván Vargas Blanco (born March 24, 1973) is a Costa Rican plasma and nuclear fusion physicist. He is renowned for his work in plasma physics and nuclear fusion. Currently, as a professor and tenured researcher at the Costa Rica Institute of Technology, he heads the Plasma Laboratory for Fusion Energy and Applications that he founded in 2011.

On August 11, 2016, Legislative Assembly of Costa Rica recognized the contributions and leadership of Vargas-Blanco in the design, construction, and implementation of the first high temperature plasma magnetic confinement Stellarator type device to be built in Latin America. This fact made Costa Rica one of only eight countries in the world to possess this type of technology for nuclear fusion research. He is a promoter of plasma physics applications for medical, agricultural, and industrial uses in his countries.

On November 30, 2016, the government of Costa Rica honored Vargas-Blanco with the Clodomiro Picado Twight National Prize for Science and Technology. A few days later, on December 4, the Costa Rican newspaper La Nación chose Vargas-Blanco as one "News Character of The Year" in their Sunday Magazine edition.

On June 4, 2018, the Director General of the International Atomic Energy Agency (IAEA), Yukiya Amano appointed Vargas-Blanco a member of the International Fusion Research Council (IFRC), to actively work on the development of the international cooperation in research on controlled nuclear fusion and its applications, as well as advising the IAEA on the activities of the nuclear fusion research and technology program. In October 2018, the Costa Rica Foreign Trade Promotion (Procomer) chose him as one of the ambassadors of the "Essential Costa Rica" Country Brand.

== Early years and education ==
Vargas-Blanco is the second of five children born in the Canton Central de Alajuela to Susana Blanco Solis and Victor Manuel Vargas Rodriguez. The family were raised in "Concepcion de la Palmera" San Carlos de Alajuela, a rural north region of Costa Rica. His mother, Susana, is a housewife who worked daily in a family restaurant until 2018. His father, Victor, was a dairy farmer who later in life joined wife Susana managing the restaurant. Vargas-Blanco's schooling began at a small primary unified public school in Conception de la Palmera (1980–85), and he remembers, "There was a year when we were only ten students in the whole school". His interest in the sciences began early in life when many after school hours were dedicated to studying the only three science books available at the primary school.

One book titled, "Lo Que Queremos Saber de la Técnica" (What We Want To Know About Technique) fostered a deep desire to learn more about rockets and nuclear fusion. Even as a child, Vargas-Blanco would compose notes on ideas about particle physics and nuclear fusion.

I filled a notebook with my questions and leave a space to later come back and try to answer them. I would ask myself: what happens when a proton collides with a neutron or another proton? I came up with sketches of a nuclear fusion propulsion rocket that I was going to build and send into space, or so I believed. — Ivan Vargas-Blanco

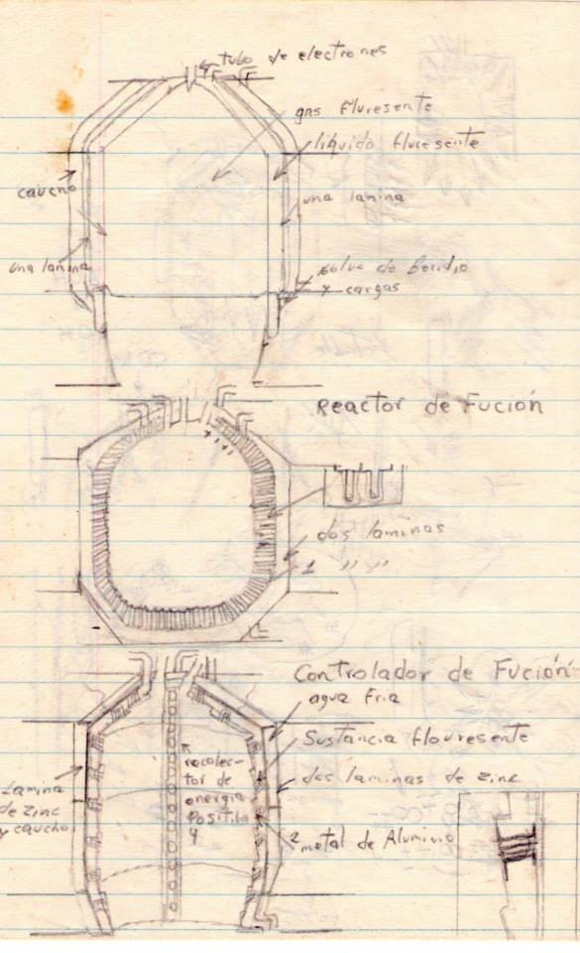
Draft of a nuclear fusion rocket by child Iván Vargas Blanco

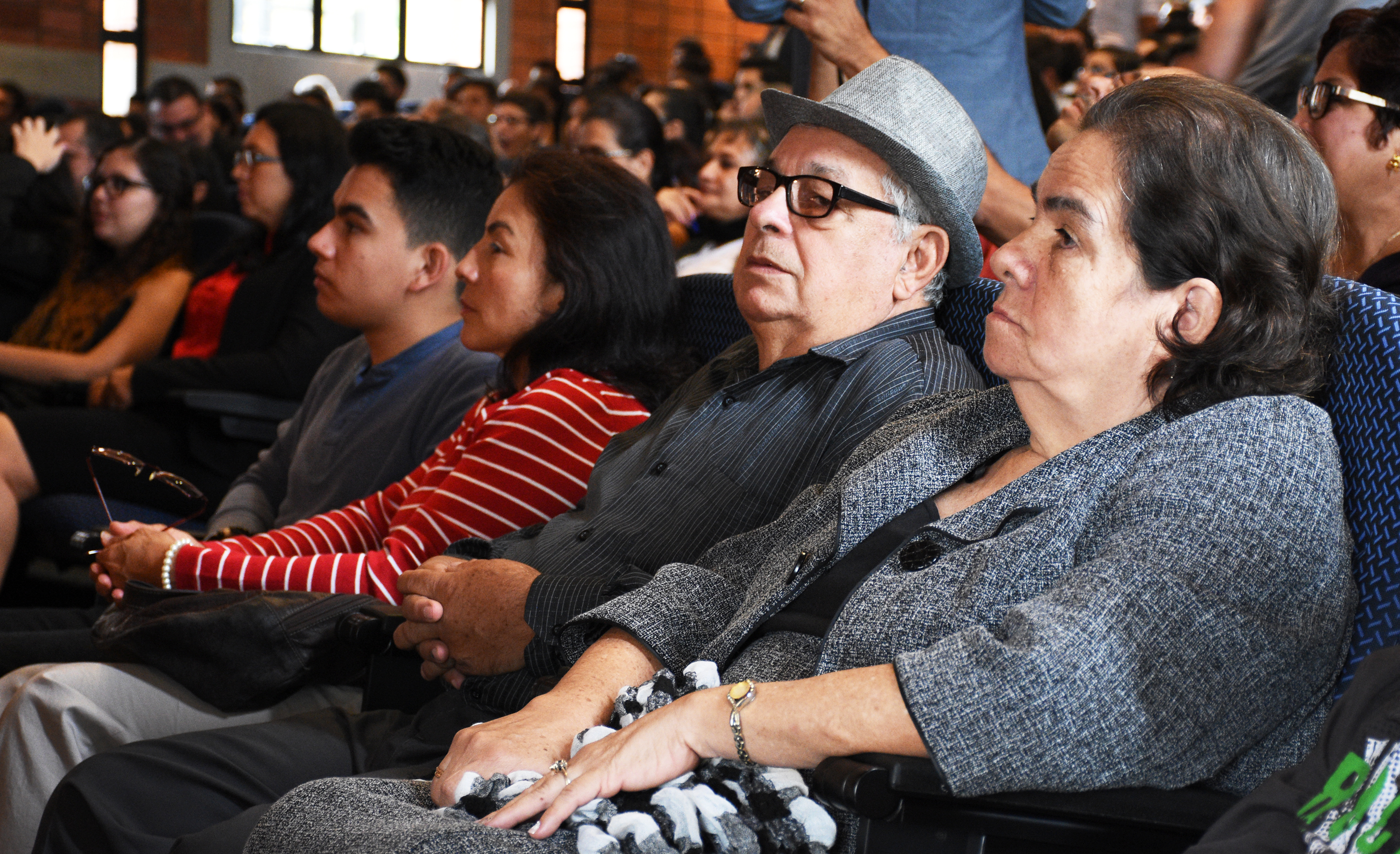
Vargas-Blanco's parents during the event of the first plasma in SCR-1. Photo Ruth Garita, OCM-TEC.

From childhood to adolescence, Vargas-Blanco would spend his free time doing homemade experiments in his father's dairy.

I got to the point where I had a completely homemade lab because I could not afford to buy one. It consisted of veterinary jars that my father had at the dairy; I made myself a microscope with a surveyor lens and a centrifuge with a toy engine. My chemistry laboratory was made out of tools and products that my father had at the dairy. I would do experiments every day, up the point when one day I almost burned my Dad's dairy. — Ivan Vargas-Blanco

Vargas-Blanco completed his secondary studies at the Colegio Técnico Profesional Agropecuario de Aguas Zarcas in San Carlos, Alajuela. He had three kilometer daily walks followed by a one-hour truck ride to reach the school. There, he founded a scientific club and participated in The National Fairs of Science and Technology, earning several awards of merit including first place at a national level in 1989. His project received a perfect score.

The University of Costa Rica accepted Ivan Vargas-Blanco to its undergraduate program majoring in physics in 1991. One year later, concerned about the practicality of pursuing a career in physics, he switched his major to Electrical Engineering. However, the young undergraduate's doubts were short lived. By year three he returned to a major in physics, even though the family could no longer support the studies because of economic limitations.

Undaunted, he studied mathematics then taught in high school academies to finance aspirations for a career in physics. The studies at the University of Costa Rica led to an undergraduate degree in 2000.

His father, Don Victor, recalls asking "Ivan, why do you study something so difficult? I don't see a job market for it". His son's stoic reply, "Dad, you have to die doing what you like". — Andrea Solano, journalist, La Nación newspaper

By 2001, grad student Ivan Vargas-Blanco was hired as a professor at the Costa Rica Institute of Technology, then in 2002 was awarded a two-year doctoral scholarship from the Instituto de Acustica del Consejo Superior de Investigaciones Científicas and the Complutense University of Madrid in Spain. During his second year in Spain, Vargas-Blanco was accepted into the PhD program in Plasma and Nuclear Fusion at Complutense University of Madrid, entering into the Centro de Investigaciones Energéticas, Medioambientales y Tecnológicas (CIEMAT), where the Laboratorio Nacional de Fusion is located. It was here that Vargas-Blanco developed his doctoral thesis project on local plasma transport in magnetic confinement devices. Once the two-year scholarship was over, Vargas-Blanco once again had to find gainful employment to finish his studies. Never to give up on his dreams for a career in physics, he got a scholarship from the Ministerio de Educación de España and his doctoral studies were completed on June 26, 2008.

The easy things are less valued. Since things have been hard for me, I value a lot of what I have achieved throughout my life. — Ivan Vargas-Blanco

== Career ==
=== Research ===
Vargas-Blanco received his doctorate in Plasmas and Nuclear Fusion from the Complutense University of Madrid in 2008. His PhD thesis entitled "Transporte local en plasmas ECRH de un dispositivo Heliac de confinamiento magnético" (Local transport in ECRH plasmas of a Heliac magnetic confinement device) is carried out at the Centro de Investigaciones Energéticas, Medioambientales y Tecnológicas (CIEMAT) where the National Fusion Laboratory is located.

It presents the results of thermal transport characterization in plasmas of the Spanish Stellarator TJ-II and its dependence on density, rotational transformation and heating power. Additionally, it shows results of the study of particle transport in this device and its dependence on density. Vargas-Blanco's work represents one of the first scientific evidences of the influence and improvement of thermal confinement due to the rational surfaces in Stellarator devices.

During his doctoral studies, Vargas-Blanco participated in other scientific activities such as the calibration and maintenance of the electronic cyclotron emission diagnosis for the measurement of plasma temperature and activities within the electronic cyclotron resonance heating group of the Stellarator TJ-II.

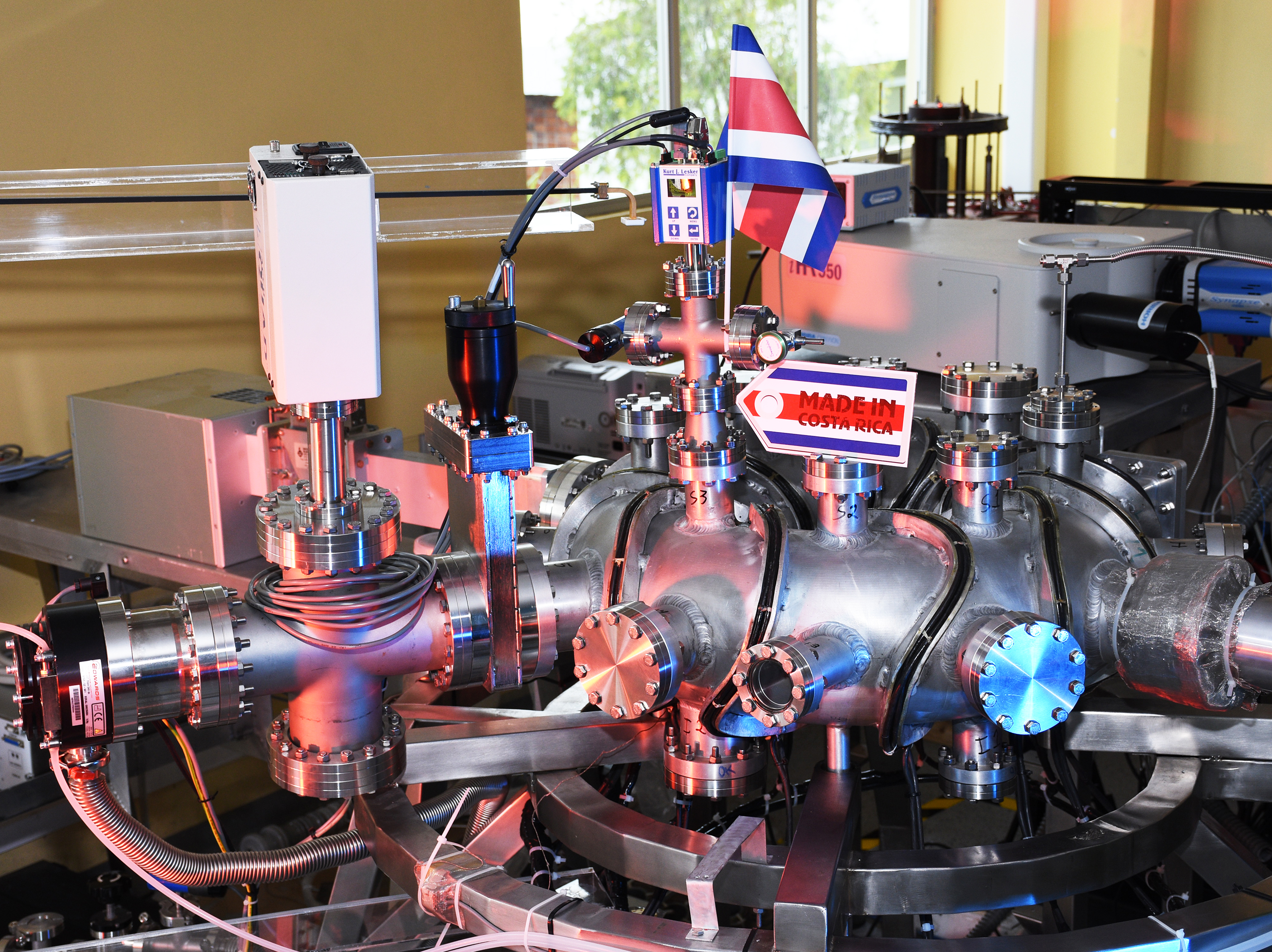
Stellarator of Costa Rica 1 (SCR-1). Photo Ruth Garita, OCM-TEC.

Prior to his return to Costa Rica, Vargas-Blanco succeeded in having the CIEMAT and the Costa Rica Institute of Technology sign a collaboration agreement to promote research in nuclear fusion plasmas between the two institutions. This allowed him in 2009 to continue conducting research in the field of nuclear fusion in Costa Rica with the dream of creating a laboratory and building a Stellarator device.

Working towards his goals in plasma research, Vargas-Blanco founded in 2008 the Grupo de Plasmas y Aplicaciones in the Costa Rica Institute of Technology, and began the purchase and acquisition of scientific equipment. In 2009, the Project Stellarator of Costa Rica 1 (SCR-1) was launched with a group of enthusiastic students. The aim was to build the first device of its kind in Latin America. Since the creation of the Plasma Laboratory for Fusion Energy and Applications in 2011, coordinator Vargas-Blanco has promoted seventeen research projects in fusion, plasmas and their applications for Costa Rican medical, agricultural and industrial uses. These projects got the attention of the University of Wisconsin-Madison in the United States compelling them to donate a spherical tokamak, known as a MEDUSA (Madison Education Small Aspect Ratio, now known as MEDUSA-CR), to the Costa Rica Institute of Technology, thus turning the university into one of the few in the world boasting both a Stellarator and a spherical tokamak.

Vargas-Blanco has consolidated his research group, which has gained international recognition for work in plasma physics and fusion-related applications, contributing to Costa Rica’s visibility within the Latin American scientific community in this field..

From 20 to 31 January 2014, Vargas-Blanco organized in Costa Rica three international Plasma Physics and Nuclear Fusion conferences and one Plasma Physics Workshop. Vargas-Blanco is a representative of Costa Rica in the International Scientific Committee of the Latin American Workshop on Plasma Physics, and the Conference from the International Atomic Energy Agency in the topics of exploring practical applications for small nuclear fusion devices. He has participated as a consultant of the International Atomic Energy Agency in the subject of research in nuclear fusion media, and he is also a member of good standing in the American Physical Society (APS), and a member of The Society of Plasma and Nuclear Sciences of the IEEE (NPSS).

=== University teaching ===
Due to his interest to establish new generations of scientists in the field of plasmas and fusion, Vargas-Blanco has taught the course "Plasma Physics and Applications I" for more than eight years at the Costa Rica Institute of Technology. This is a course that covers the introduction to the plasmas physics, charged particles in magnetic and electric fields, plasma as fluids, waves in plasmas, collisions, conductivity and diffusion, and the discharges types. In 2018, he taught the second course "Plasma Physics for Engineering II", adding topics as: plasma generation, introduction to plasma diagnosis, computational plasma physics, and plasma for nuclear fusion and surface treatment by plasma. Vargas is also a professor of general physics courses and general physics laboratories at the TEC School of Physics.

== Scientific labor ==
Vargas-Blanco's scientific and technological contribution has focused on the physics and engineering of Stellarators. In physics, he has contributed to the characterization and understanding of thermal and particle transportation in helical magnetic confinement devices. In engineering, he led the design, construction and implementation of the first Stellarator in Latin America, which makes Costa Rica one of the eight countries in the world to have this technology for the research on nuclear fusion. Additionally, since 2006 he leads the implementation of the magnetic confinement device of the Tokamak Spherical type called MEDUSA-CR (Madison Education Small Aspect Ratio of Costa Rica) in the Costa Rican Institute of Technology. Likewise, he has participated as a co-author in scientific articles on the use of plasma in medicine, agriculture and industry.

== First plasma discharge in a Stellarator in Latin America ==
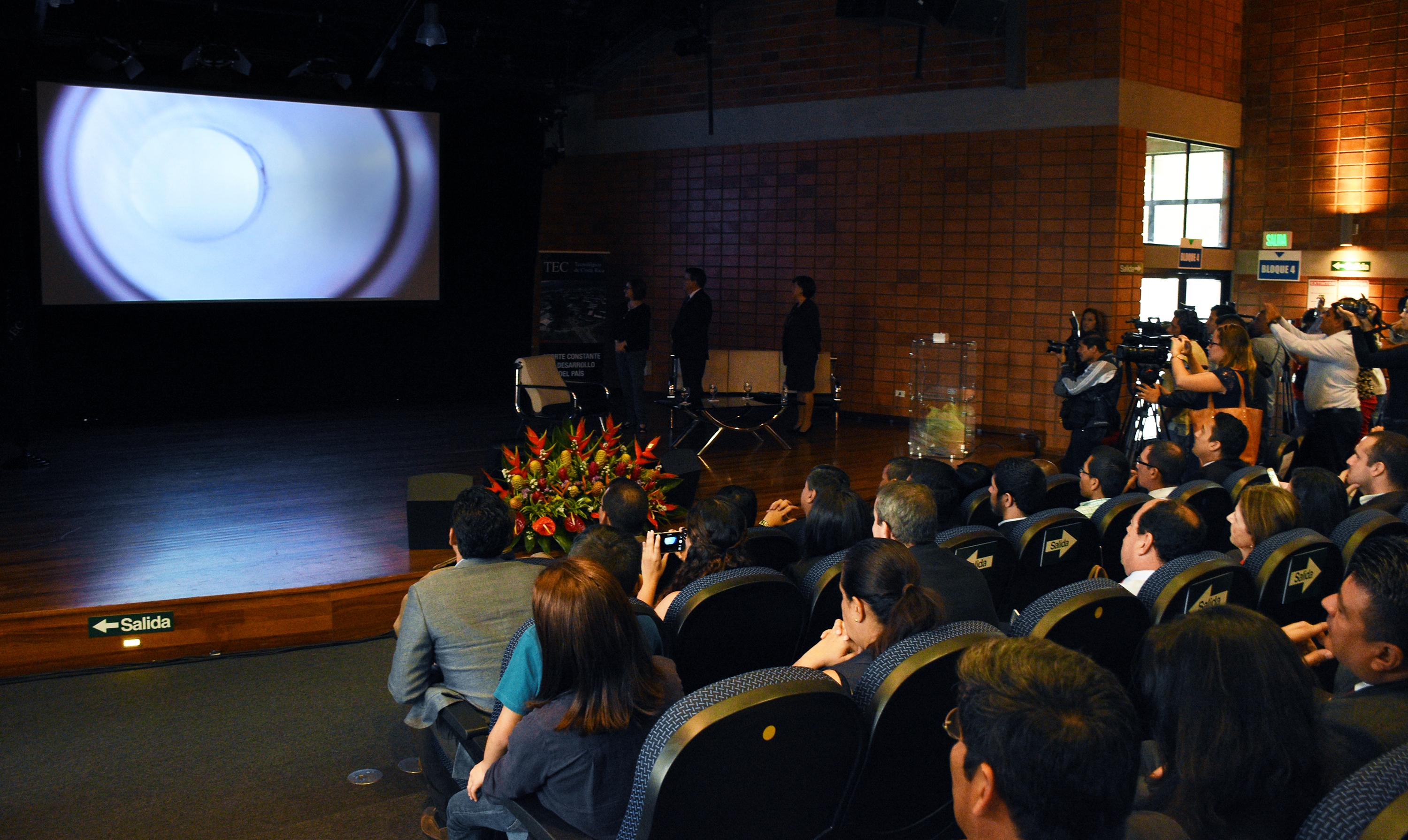
Event of the First plasma discharge in a Stellarator in Latin America. Photo Ruth Garita, OCM-TEC.

On 29 June 2016, Vargas-Blanco and his research team set a scientific and technological milestone in Costa Rica. After six years of design, construction and implementation, they started operations of the first Stellarator-type high temperature plasma magnetic confinement device in Latin America, this took Costa Rica to become one of the eight countries in the world to have this technology for nuclear fusion research. The event was broadcast live via the TEC YouTube channel. According to the Communication and Marketing Office of the TEC, it is estimated that over 3 million people followed the news. The ceremony included recorded congratulatory messages from Stewart Prager, director from Princeton Plasma Physics Lab (PPPL); Michael Zarnstorff, deputy director of research at PPPL; Hutch Neilson, head of advanced PPPL projects; and David Gates, physics leader of PPPL Stellarators. In addition, there was a congratulatory note from Robert Wolf, Stellarator-Heliotron Executive Committee President who belongs to the Technological Collaboration Program in the Stellarator-Heliotron Concept of the International Energy Agency. The milestone was widely disseminated in the national and international news press, such as CNN en español, and Scientific American, as well as research centers such as Max Planck Institute for Plasma Physics (IPP) in Germany and PPPL in the USA.

== Personal life ==
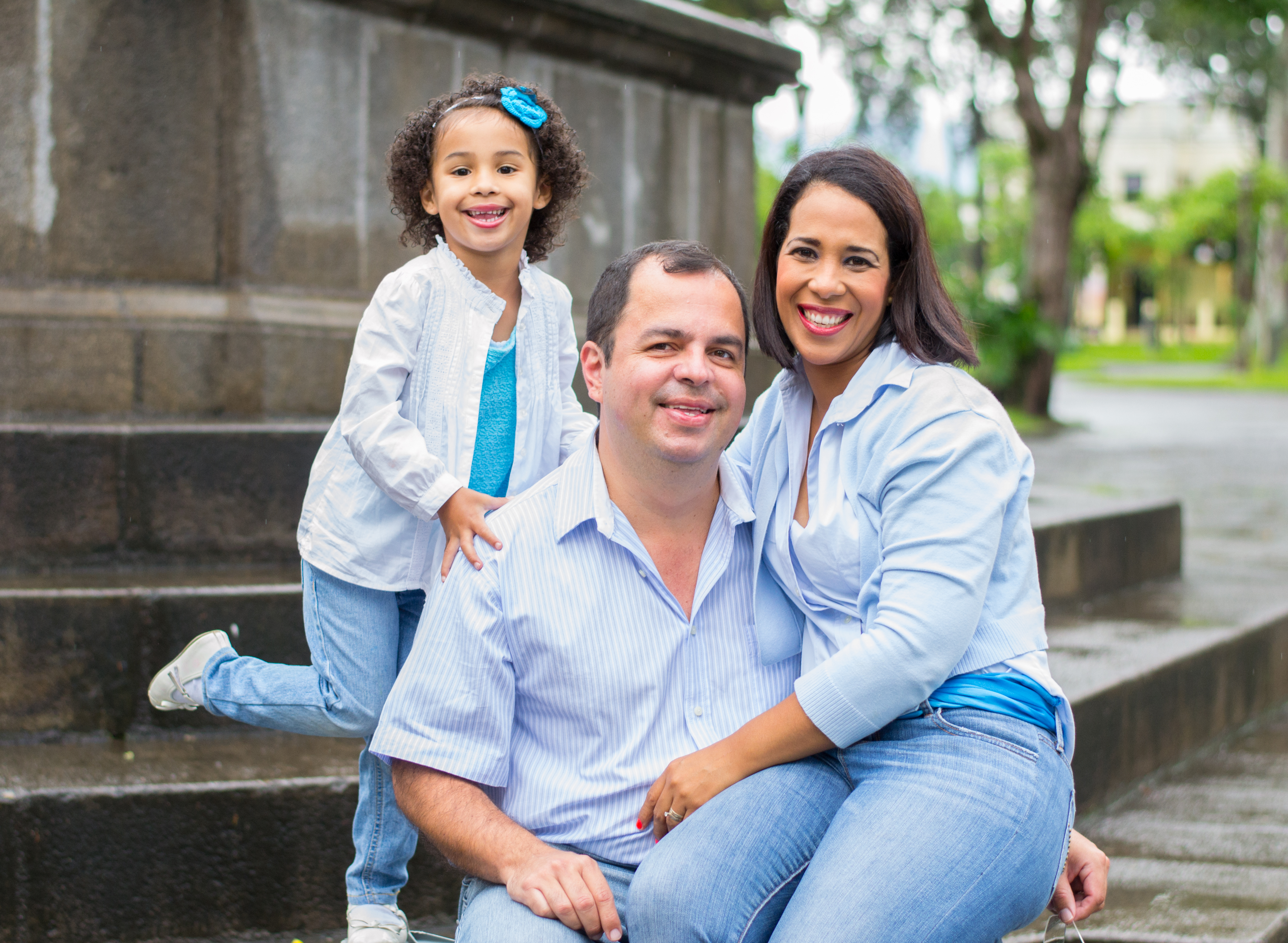
Yoslaidy, Ivanna and Ivan.

Just sixteen days after defending his PhD Thesis, Vargas-Blanco married Yoslaidy Rivera Peña on July 12, 2008. Yoslaidy is a Dominican who studied Business Administration in Madrid where they met during their student years. They have a daughter named Ivanna Vargas Rivera who was born in Costa Rica in 2010. Vargas-Blanco continues to enthusiastically consume popular scientific articles and science documentaries. He also has an affection for Latin American music such as salsa, merengue, and cumbia, having taken dance classes for two years.

== Awards and recognitions ==
On August 11, 2016, the Legislative Assembly of the Republic of Costa Rica awarded Vargas-Blanco with recognition for having led the design, construction, and implementation of the first high temperature plasma magnetic confinement device of the Stellarator Type in Latin America, making Costa Rica one of the eight countries in the world to possess this technology for nuclear fusion research. Likewise, on August 25, 2016, the Municipality of Cartago in its extraordinary session 26-2016 Municipal Council recognized him, as did the Chamber of Commerce, Industry, Tourism, and Services of Cartago in December. Constructing and implementing the first Stellarator Type plasma confinement device was a milestone for the country.

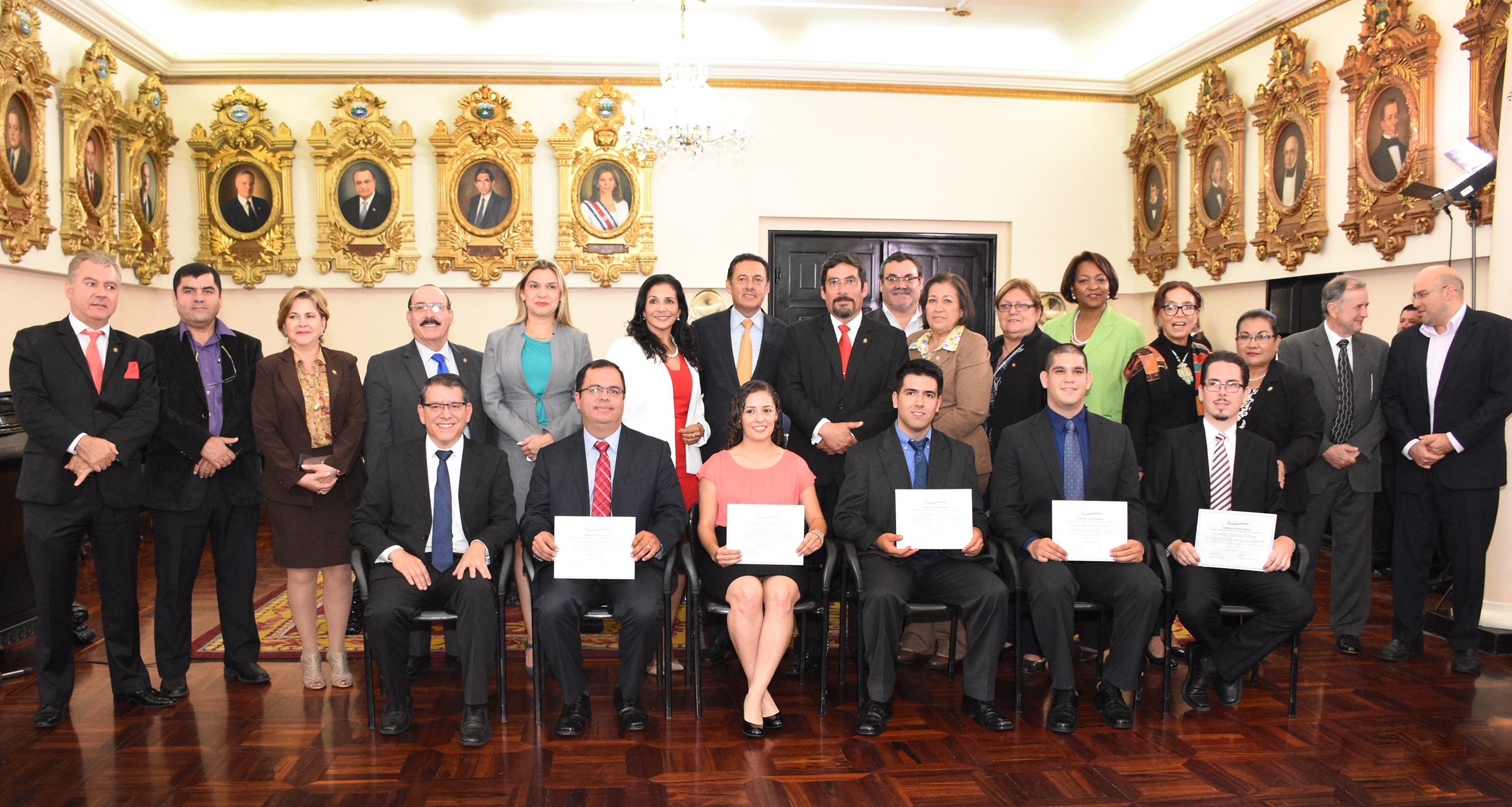
Recognition from the Legislative Assembly of Costa Rica. Photo Ruth Garita, OCM-TEC.

The government of Costa Rica awarded Vargas-Blanco with the Clodomiro Picado Twight National Prize for Science and Technology on November 30, of that year. The newspaper La Nación chose Vargas-Blanco as one of the "New Person of the Year" published in the December 2016 edition of their Sunday Magazine. On November 27, 2017, Vargas-Blanco was chosen by the IAEA as one of their twenty eight scientists/representatives worldwide making him the only Latin American member of the Fusion Energy Conference Program Committee, the world's most important conference on plasmas for nuclear fusion sponsored by the IAEA.

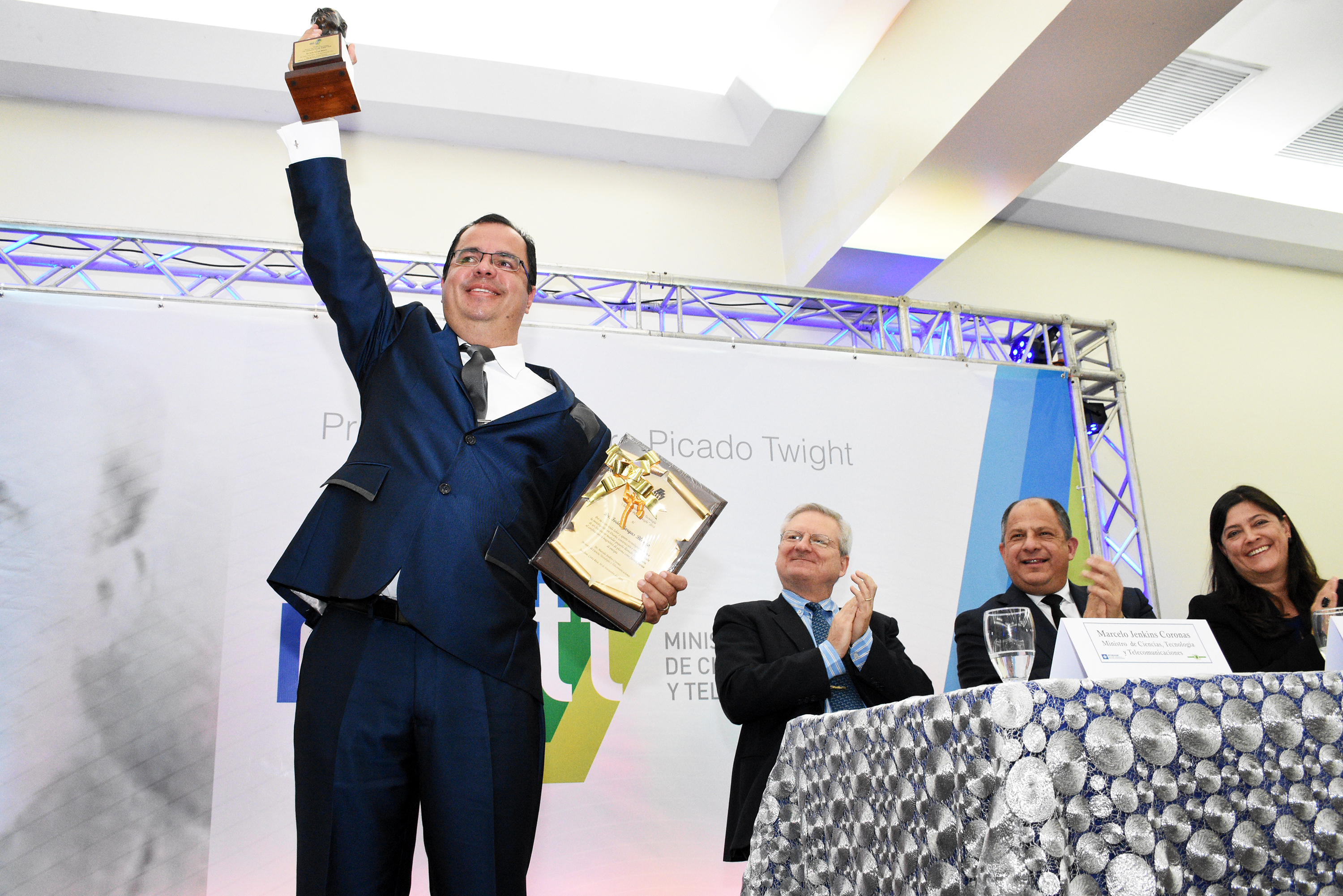
Clodomiro Picado Twight National Prize for Science and Technology event. Photo Ruth Garita, OCM-TEC.

On June 4, 2018, the Director General of the International Atomic Energy Agency (IAEA), Yukiya Amano appointed Vargas-Blanco a member of the International Fusion Research Council (IFRC), to actively work on the development of the international cooperation in research on controlled nuclear fusion and its applications, as well as advising the IAEA on the activities of the nuclear fusion research and technology program. On October 26, the Canadian International School appointed Vargas-Blanco the "Golden Lamp award" in the area of science for his outstanding work as a scientist. Finally, in October 2018, the Costa Rica Foreign Trade Promotion (Procomer) chose him as one of the ambassadors of the "Essential Costa Rica" Country Brand.

== Appearances in media ==
As a scientist, Vargas-Blanco has appeared on radio, television, in print media and other media in Costa Rica, including Teletica Radio, interview space Diálogos "Periódico La Nación", Channel 13, Channel 7 (Telenoticias and Teletica.com), Channel 6 (Repretel News), Channel 11 (NC Once), TeleSur and Canal UCR (Spectrum).

In 2008, Costa Rican journalist Ana Madrigal Castro won the Journalism Award in Science, Technology, and Innovation, sponsored by CONICIT, for an insightful interview with Vargas-Blanco about the world of the new plasma physics. Again in 2017, journalist Andrea Solano, scored an Honorable Mention of the same Journalism Award in Science, Technology, and Innovation sponsored by CONICIT promoting the dissemination of cutting-edge scientific research. Her biographical essay for the Journal La Nación was titled, 'The Country Boy Who Became a Scientist", recounting the exceptional life and times of Ivan Vargas-Blanco, a true Costa Rican success story. With his popularity soaring, Vargas-Blanco was asked to join the promotional campaign for the 'Essential Costa Rica' Country Brand of the Promotors of External Commerce of Costa Rica (Procomer).

== See also ==
- Stellarator of Costa Rica 1 (SCR-1)
- Stellarator
- Tokamak
- Nuclear fusion
