= Mirnov =

Mirnov may refer to:

- Igor Mirnov, Russian ice hockey player
- Mirnov oscillations, a type of magnetic field oscillation that is observed in a plasma
