= Classical diffusion =

Classical diffusion is a key concept in fusion power and other fields where a plasma is confined by a magnetic field within a vessel. It considers collisions between ions in the plasma that causes the particles to move to different paths and eventually leave the confinement volume and strike the sides of the vessel.

The rate of diffusion carries an inverse-square proportionality with the magnetic field, i.e., D ~ 1/B^{2}, where D is the diffusion coefficient and B is the magnetic field strength, implying that confinement times can be greatly improved with small increases in field strength. In practice, the rates suggested by classical diffusion have not been found in real-world machines, where a host of previously unknown plasma instabilities caused the particles to leave confinement at rates closer to B, not B^{2}, as had been seen in Bohm diffusion.

The failure of classical diffusion to predict real-world plasma behavior led to a period in the 1960s known as "the doldrums" where it appeared a practical fusion reactor would be impossible. Over time, the instabilities were found and addressed, especially in the tokamak. This has led to a deeper understanding of the diffusion process, known as neoclassical transport.

== Description ==
Particles in a plasma orbit around the magnetic field lines with a radius that varies with the strength of the field. Here we have the same particles in two fields, a weaker one on the left and a stronger one on the right. The chance that a particle will undergo a collision is a function of the area it sweeps out, and thus a function of the square of the magnetic field strength.

Diffusion is a random walk process that can be quantified by the two key parameters: Δx, the step size, and Δt, the time interval when the walker takes a step. Thus, the diffusion coefficient is defined as D ≡ (Δx)^{2} / Δt. Plasma is a gas-like mixture of high-temperature particles, the electrons and ions that would normally be joined to form neutral atoms at lower temperatures. Temperature is a measure of the average velocity of particles, so high temperatures imply high speeds, and thus a plasma will quickly expand at rates that make it difficult to work with unless some form of "confinement" is applied.

At the temperatures involved in nuclear fusion, no material container can hold a plasma. The most common solution to this problem is to use a magnetic field to provide confinement, sometimes known as a "magnetic bottle". When a charged particle is placed in a magnetic field, it will orbit the field lines while continuing to move along that line with whatever initial velocity it had. This produces a helical path through space. The radius of the path is a function of the strength of the magnetic field. Since the axial velocities will have a range of values, often based on the Maxwell-Boltzmann statistics, this means the particles in the plasma will pass by others as they overtake them or are overtaken.

If one considers two such ions traveling along parallel axial paths, they can collide whenever their orbits intersect. In most geometries, this means there is a significant difference in the instantaneous velocities when they collide - one might be going "up" while the other would be going "down" in their helical paths. This causes the collisions to scatter the particles, making them random walks. Eventually, this process will cause any given ion to eventually leave the boundary of the field, and thereby escape "confinement".

In a uniform magnetic field, a particle undergoes random walk across the field lines by the step size of gyroradius ρ ≡ v_{th} / Ω, where v_{th} denotes the thermal velocity, and Ω ≡ qB/m, the gyrofrequency. The steps are randomized by the collisions to lose the coherence. Thus, the time step, or the decoherence time, is the inverse of the collisional frequency ν_{c}. The rate of diffusion is given by ν_{c}ρ^{2}, with the rather favorable B^{−2} scaling law.

== In practice ==
When the topic of controlled fusion was first being studied, it was believed that the plasmas would follow the classical diffusion rate, and this suggested that useful confinement times would be relatively easy to achieve. However, in 1949 a team studying plasma arcs as a method of isotope separation found that the diffusion time was much greater than what was predicted by the classical method. David Bohm suggested it scaled with B. If this is true, Bohm diffusion would mean that useful confinement times would require impossibly large fields. Initially, Bohm diffusion was dismissed as a side-effect of the particular experimental apparatus being used and the heavy ions within it, causing turbulence within the plasma that led to faster diffusion. It seemed the larger fusion machines using much lighter atoms would not be subject to this problem.

When the first small-scale fusion machines were being built in the mid-1950s, they appeared to follow the B^{−2} rule, so there was great confidence that simply scaling the machines to larger sizes with more powerful magnets would meet the requirements for practical fusion. In fact, when such machines were built, like the British ZETA and U.S. Model-B stellarator were built, they demonstrated confinement times much more in line with Bohm diffusion. To examine this, the Model-B2 stellarator was run at a wide variety of field strengths and the resulting diffusion times were measured. This demonstrated a linear relationship, as predicted by Bohm. As more machines were introduced this problem continued to hold, and by the 1960s the entire field had been taken over by "the doldrums".

Further experiments demonstrated that the problem was not diffusion per se, but a host of previously unknown plasma instabilities caused by the magnetic and electric fields and the motion of the particles. As critical operating conditions were passed, these processes would start and quickly drive the plasma out of confinement. Over time, a number of new designs attacked these instabilities, and by the late 1960s there were several machines that were clearly beating the Bohm rule. Among these was the Soviet tokamak, which quickly became the focus of most research to this day.

As tokamaks took over the research field, it became clear that the original estimates based on the classical formula still did not apply exactly. This was due to the toroidal arrangement of the device; particles on the inside of the ring-shaped reactor see higher magnetic fields than on the outside, simply due to geometry, and this introduced a number of new effects. Consideration of these effects led to the modern concept of neoclassical transport.

== See also ==
- Bohm diffusion
- Plasma diffusion
