= Quasisymmetric =

In mathematics, quasisymmetric may refer to:

- Quasisymmetric functions in algebraic combinatorics
- Quasisymmetric maps in complex analysis or metric spaces
- Quasi-symmetric designs in combinatorial design theory

== See also ==
- Quasisymmetry, a concept in magnetic confinement fusion
