= Allen Boozer =

American physicist (born 1944)

- Born: July 28, 1944 (age 82); Orangeburg, South Carolina, U.S.
- Education: University of Virginia (B.A., 1966); Cornell University (Ph.D., 1970)
- Known for: Boozer coordinates Quasisymmetry; Quasi-isodynamicity; Electron cyclotron current drive
- Awards: Hannes Alfvén Prize (2010); Phi Beta Kappa; Woodrow Wilson Fellowship; NSF Fellowship
- Scientific career
- Fields: Plasma physics
- Workplaces: Columbia University
- Military career
- Allegiance: United States of America
- Branch: United States Air Force
- Service years: 1970–1974
- Rank: officer
- Unit: Air Force Cambridge Research Laboratories
- Awards: Commendation Medal
- Website: https://www.apam.columbia.edu/faculty-staff/directory/allen-h-boozer

Allen Boozer (born July 28, 1944 in Orangeburg, South Carolina) is an American physicist. He is currently a full professor at the Department of Applied Physics and Applied Mathematics of Columbia University. He was previously a theorist at Princeton Plasma Physics Laboratory between 1974 and 1986, where his final position was acting head of Theory.

He is noted for work in plasma physics and fusion physics. Boozer coordinates are named after him. In 1983, he discovered toroidal magnetic field quasi-symmetries ("hidden symmetries"), which are the basis for all modern stellarator power plant proposals and advanced experiments, including Wendelstein 7-X, HSX, and NCSX.

In 1981, he patented Electron Cyclotron Current Drive (ECCD) with Nathaniel Fisch. ECCD is an important means of creating current flows in toroidal magnetic confinement fusion devices, such as tokamaks and stellarators.

In 1982, Boozer was elected a Fellow of the American Physical Society (APS). In 1989, he was elected to external scientific membership in the German Max Planck Society. From 1998 to 2001 he chaired the APS's Division of Plasma Physics.

In 2010, he received the Hannes Alfvén Prize with Jürgen Nührenberg for "the formulation and practical application of criteria allowing stellarators to have good fast-particle and neoclassical energy confinement".

In 2018, he was a Founding Principal Investigator on the Simons Collaboration on Hidden Symmetries and Fusion Energy.

== Education ==
- Ph.D., physics, Cornell University, 1970.
- Bachelor-of-arts degree in physics from the University of Virginia in 1966
- Elected to Phi Beta Kappa as an undergraduate and received Woodrow Wilson and National Science Foundation fellowships as a graduate student.
