= Jürgen Nührenberg =

German physicist

- Born: February 2, 1942 (age 84)
- Education: University of Göttingen; LMU Munich (Ph.D.)
- Known for: Stellarator physics Quasisymmetry; Quasi-isodynamicity; Wendelstein 7-X
- Awards: Hannes Alfvén Prize (2010)
- Scientific career
- Fields: Plasma physics
- Workplaces: Max Planck Institute for Plasma Physics; University of Greifswald
- Thesis: Lineare und toroidale magnetohydrostatische Gleichgewichte (1969)

Jürgen Nührenberg (born February 2, 1942, in Berlin) is a German plasma physicist.

Nührenberg studied physics at the University of Göttingen and LMU Munich, where he received his doctorate from Arnulf Schlüter in 1969 (translated: Linear and Toroidal Magnetohydrostatic Equilibria). He was a post-doctoral student at the University of Iowa and the Courant Institute of Mathematical Sciences of New York University. In 1971, he worked at the Max Planck Institute for Plasma Physics (IPP) in Garching near Munich, where he dealt with the theory of stellarators for controlled nuclear fusion.

In 1979, he became the head of the group "Theorie dreidimensionaler Systeme" (Theory of three-dimensional systems) and in 1981 the head of the group "Stellaratorphysik" (Stellarator Physics). In 1996, he became a scientific member of the IPP. In 1997, he became the Greifswald branch director of the IPP and a professor at the University of Greifswald.

In the 1980s, Nührenberg and Allen Boozer developed methods to optimize the magnetic field of the stellarator in such a way that the stability of plasma confinement became comparable to those of the tokamak. In contrast to tokamaks, stellarators work continuously but have more complicated magnetic fields that do not have simple rotational symmetry. Boozer formulated conditions of stability for the stellarator magnetic fields (including quasi-symmetry) and Nührenberg showed that these could be implemented in concrete magnetic field configurations.

In 1988, Nührenberg published the first ever numerical approximation to quasi-helical symmetry in a stellarator with buildable coils.

These concepts were experimentally implemented in the Wendelstein 7-AS stellarator, and provided the fundamental novel property of the Wendelstein 7-X stellarator in Greifswald and the HSX stellarator in the United States. Since 1990, Nührenberg has been a member of the project management team involved in the planning of the Wendelstein 7-X and has played a key role in its development.

In 2010, he received the Hannes Alfvén Prize with Allen Boozer for "the formulation and practical application of criteria allowing stellarators to have good fast-particle and neoclassical energy confinement".
