= Plasma diffusion =

Physical phenomenon

In plasma physics, plasma diffusion is the transport of charged particles in a plasma resulting from spatial gradients in particle density and, in many cases, temperature. In contrast to diffusion in neutral gases, the motion of electrons and ions in a plasma is not generally independent, because their dynamics are coupled through electromagnetic interactions.

In collisional plasmas, diffusion processes are influenced by self-consistent electromagnetic fields that arise when electrons and ions respond differently to spatial gradients. These fields act to reduce charge separation and couple the motion of the charged species. As a result, the diffusion of electrons and ions is typically linked rather than occurring at independent rates, leading to a collective transport process often described in terms of ambipolar diffusion.

Plasma diffusion across a magnetic field is an important topic in magnetic confinement of fusion plasma. It especially concerns how plasma transport is related to the strength of an external magnetic field B. Classical diffusion predicts the 1/B^{2} scaling, while Bohm diffusion, borne out of experimental observations from early confinement machines, was conjectured to follow the 1/B scaling. It is still an area of active research.

== See also ==
- Magnetic diffusion
