= HSX =

HSX may refer to:

- Helically Symmetric Experiment
- Hengshan West railway station, China Railway pinyin code HSX
- Ho Chi Minh City Stock Exchange
- Hollywood Stock Exchange, an online game
- Hoshiarpur railway station, in Punjab, India
- HSX Films, now Ignite Entertainment
- HSX Handbrake Shifter, Brazilian manufacturer of racing simulation devices
- HSX: Hypersonic Xtreme, a video game
- Mitsubishi HSX, a concept car
