= High-Tech Gründerfonds =

Venture capital investment firm in Germany

- Company type: Public-private partnership
- Industry: Private equity
- Founded: 2005
- Headquarters: Bonn, Germany
- Key people: Sebastian Borek, Dr. Achim Plum and Romy Schnelle
- Products: Venture capital, growth capital
- Number of employees: >100

HTGF (High-Tech Gründerfonds) is a public-private venture capital investment firm based in Bonn, Germany, with additional offices in Berlin and Munich. As an early stage seed investor, HTGF focuses on high potential high-tech startups in industrial tech, deep tech, climate tech, digital tech, life sciences and chemistry. HTGF is among the most active venture capital investors in Europe.

== Foundation and Fund Investors ==
High-Tech Gründerfonds is a public–private partnership and was founded in 2005 to address a funding gap in early stages and foster growth in high-tech startups.

Across its four generations of seed funds, investors include the Federal Ministry of Economic Affairs and Energy, the KfW Banking Group owned by the federal government, and industrial groups of ALTANA, BASF, B.Braun, Robert Bosch, BÜFA, CEWE, Deutsche Post DHL, Dräger, Drillisch AG, EVONIK, EWE AG, Haniel, Hettich, Knauf, Körber, LANXESS, media + more venture Beteiligungs GmbH & Co. KG, PHOENIX CONTACT, Postbank, QIAGEN, RWE Generation SE, SAP, Schufa, Schwarz Gruppe, STIHL, Thüga, Vector Informatik und WACKER. HTGF has a fund volume of over 2 billion euros across all funds, including the HTGF Opportunity Fund launched in 2024.

== Investments ==
HTGF provides seed financing to allow startups to take their ideas through the prototyping phase up to the market launch. Usually, High-Tech Gründerfonds invests about €1,000,000 in the seed stage. HTGF is able to contribute significantly in later financing rounds.

High-Tech Gründerfonds has approximately 790 companies in its portfolio. The portfolio includes companies from the fields of Industrial Tech, Life Sciences, Climate Tech, and Digital Tech. Among them is Proxima Fusion, which is working on technologies for controlled nuclear fusion, as well as ATMOS Space Cargo, which develops return systems for space cargo. In the area of recycling, EEDEN focuses on chemical upcycling of textile waste.

Other examples include doinstruct, a provider of mobile learning solutions for industrial workers, and Plancraft, which offers software solutions for craft businesses. In the field of medical technology, Argá Medtech develops catheter systems for the treatment of cardiac arrhythmias, while Tubulis works on antibody-drug conjugates for oncology.

In the energy sector, instagrid provides mobile battery systems. SimScale offers a web-based platform for engineering simulations, and VMRay develops analysis tools for detecting IT threats. The portfolio also includes EGYM, a provider of digitally connected fitness solutions.
