= Léon Lecornu =

French engineer and physicist

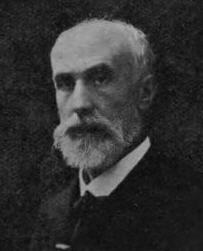
- Born: 13 January 1854; Caen, France
- Died: 13 November 1940 (aged 86); Saint-Aubin-sur-Mer, France
- Education: Lycée Malherbe
- Alma mater: École Polytechnique; École des Mines de Paris
- Awards: Poncelet Prize (1900)

Léon Lecornu (13 January 1854, Caen – 13 November 1940, Saint-Aubin-sur-Mer, Calvados) was a French engineer and physicist.

After his secondary education at the Lycée de Caen, Léon Lecornu obtained his engineering degree from École Polytechnique in 1872. In 1893, he was appointed professor at the Faculté de Caen, then at l’école des mines, and in 1900 at l’École polytechnique 1904.

He was elected a member of l'Académie des sciences in 1910 (section de mécanique).

He was the brother of Joseph Lecornu.

== Bibliography ==
- Cours de mécanique, Paris, Gauthier-Villars, 1914–1918
- Dynamique appliquée, Paris, Doin, 1908
- La mécanique, les idées et les faits, Paris, Flammarion, 1918
- Les régulateurs des machines à vapeur, Paris, Dunod, 1904
- Note sur le laboratoire aérodynamique Eiffel à Auteuil, Paris, Gauthier-Villars, 1914
- Sur la métallurgie du fer en basse-Normandie, Caen, Le Blanc-Hardel, 1884
- Sur l'équilibre des surfaces flexibles et inextensibles. Suivi de Propositions données par la Faculté, Paris, Gauthier-Villars, 1880, read online.
- Théorie mathématique de l'élasticité, Paris, Gauthier-Villars, 1929, réimp. 1967

== See also ==
- Rayleigh–Lorentz pendulum
