= Helically Symmetric Experiment =

Plasma confinement device

HSX
Helically Symmetric eXperiment
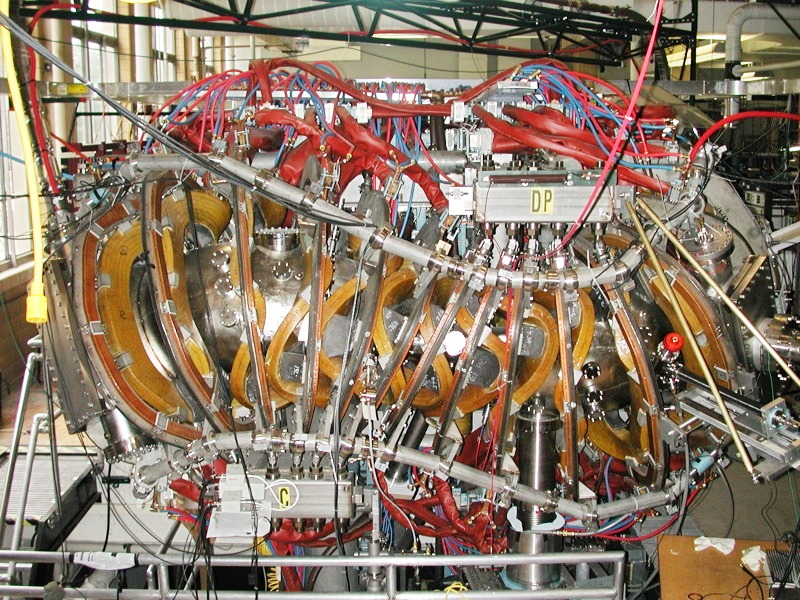
- Device type: Stellarator
- Location: Madison, Wisconsin, US
- Affiliation: University of Wisconsin–Madison

Technical specifications
- Major radius: 1.2 m (3 ft 11 in)
- Minor radius: 0.15 m (5.9 in)
- Plasma volume: 0.44 m^{3}
- Magnetic field: 1.25 T (12,500 G)
- Heating power: 100 kW (ECH)
- Discharge duration: 0.2 s (pulse)
- Plasma current: 13.4 kA
- Plasma temperature: 2000–2500 eV (electron temp.)

History
- Year(s) of operation: 1999–present

Links
- Other links: HSX Device Parameters

The Helically Symmetric Experiment (HSX, stylized as Helically Symmetric eXperiment), is an experimental plasma confinement device at the University of Wisconsin–Madison, with design principles that are intended to be incorporated into a fusion reactor. The HSX is a modular coil stellarator which is a toroid-shaped pressure vessel with external electromagnets which generate a magnetic field for the purpose of containing a plasma. It began operation in 1999.

== Background ==
A stellarator is a magnetic confinement fusion device that uses external magnetic coils to generate the magnetic fields needed to confine the high temperature plasma. In tokamaks and reversed field pinches, part of the necessary magnetic field is created by the interaction of external magnets and an electrical current flowing through the plasma. Stellarators may or may not have a large plasma current, and do not require one. Lack of a large plasma current makes a device suitable for steady-state fusion power plants.

However, due to non-axisymmetric nature of the fields, old stellarators have a combination of toroidal and helical modulation of the magnetic field lines, which leads to high transport of plasma out of the confinement volume at fusion-relevant conditions. This large transport in old stellarators can limit their performance as fusion reactors.

This loss of plasma can be reduced by tailoring the magnetic field geometry, for example by approximating a "quasi-symmetry". Quasi-helical symmetry used by HSX is one form of quasi-symmetry. The concept was proposed theoretically in 1983 by Allen Boozer. A usable approximation was first demonstrated numerically in 1988 by Jürgen Nührenberg.

Improvements in computer modeling capability have since made such configurations easier to calculate. Numerically calculated electromagnets shapes can directly produce a magnetic field configuration that combines the good confinement properties of tokamaks and the steady-state nature of conventional stellarators. Proving that such a machine can be built, and that it actually reduces transport as predicted, were the design goals of HSX.

Another successful result was obtained with the large optimised stellarator Wendelstein 7-X, which has a better particle confinement than that expected in ITER and achieves plasma duration of 30 minutes. Wendelstein 7-X does not use quasi-symmetry as the basis of its optimization.

== Device ==
The magnetic field in HSX is generated by a set of 48 twisted coils arranged in four field periods. HSX typically operates at a magnetic field of 1 tesla at the center of the plasma column. A set of auxiliary coils is used to deliberately break the symmetry to mimic conventional stellarator properties for comparison.

The HSX vacuum vessel is made of stainless steel, and is helically shaped to follow the magnetic geometry.

Plasma formation and heating is achieved using 28 GHz, 100 kW electron cyclotron resonance heating (ECRH). A second 100 kW gyrotron has recently been installed on HSX to perform heat pulse modulation studies.

=== Operations ===
Plasmas as high as 3 kiloelectronvolts in temperature and about 8×10^{12}/cc in density are routinely formed for various experiments.

Experiments have shown that edge magnetic islands affect particle fueling and exhaust. In HSX, the presence of a magnetic island chain at the plasma edge increases the plasma sourcing to exhaust ratio but reduces fueling efficiency by 25%. Moving the island radially inward decreases both the effective and global particle confinement times. This process is effective for controlling plasma fueling and helium exhaust times.

== Subsystems, diagnostics ==
HSX has a large set of diagnostics to measure properties of plasma and magnetic fields. The following gives a list of major diagnostics and subsystems.

- Thomson scattering
- Diagnostic neutral beam
- Electron cyclotron resonance heating system
- Electron cyclotron emission radiometers
- Charge exchange recombination spectroscopy
- Interferometer
- Motional Stark effect
- Heavy ion beam probe (coming soon)
- Laser blow-off
- Hard and soft-X-ray detectors
- Mirnov coils
- Rogowski coils
- Passive spectroscopy

== Goals and major achievements ==
HSX has made and continues to make fundamental contributions to the physics of quasisymmetric stellarators that show significant improvement over the conventional stellarator concept. These include:

- Measuring large ion flows in the direction of quasisymmetry
- Reduced flow damping in the direction of quasisymmetry
- Reduced passing particle deviation from a flux surface
- Reduced direct loss orbits
- Reduced neoclassical transport
- Reduced equilibrium parallel currents because of the high effective transform

== Ongoing experiments ==
A large number of experimental and computational research works are being done in HSX by students, staff and faculties. Some of them are in collaboration with other universities and national laboratories, both in the US and abroad. Major research projects at present are listed below:

- Effect of quasi-symmetry on plasma flows
- Impurity transport
- Radio frequency heating
- Supersonic plasma fueling and the neutral population
- Heat pulse propagation experiments to study thermal transport
- Interaction of turbulence and flows in HSX and the effects of quasi-symmetry on the determination of the radial electric field
- Equilibrium reconstruction of the plasma density, pressure and current profiles
- Effects of viscosity and symmetry on the determination of the flows and the radial electric field
- Divertor flows, particle edge fluxes
- Effect of radial electric field on the bootstrap current
- Effect of quasi-symmetry on fast ion confinement
