= Quasisymmetry =

Concept in magnetic confinement fusion

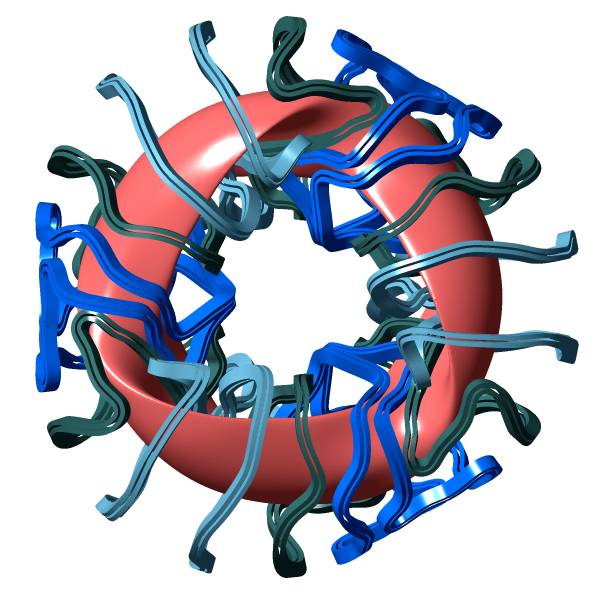
A flux surface and coils of NCSX, a quasi-symmetric stellarator.

In magnetic confinement fusion, quasisymmetry (sometimes hyphenated as quasi-symmetry) is a type of continuous symmetry in the magnetic field strength of a stellarator. Quasisymmetry is desired, as Noether's theorem implies that there exists a conserved quantity in such cases. This conserved quantity ensures that particles stick to the flux surface, resulting in better confinement and neoclassical transport.

It is currently unknown if it is mathematically possible to construct a quasi-symmetric magnetic field which upholds magnetohydrodynamic force balance, which is required for stability. There are stellarator designs which are very close to being quasisymmetric, and it is possible to find solutions by generalizing the magnetohydrodynamic force balance equation. Quasisymmetric systems are a subset of omnigenous systems. The Helically Symmetric eXperiment and the National Compact Stellarator Experiment are designed to be quasisymmetric.
