= Plasma parameter =

The plasma parameter is a dimensionless number, denoted by capital Lambda, Λ. The plasma parameter is usually interpreted to be the argument of the Coulomb logarithm, which is the ratio of the maximum impact parameter to the classical distance of closest approach in Coulomb scattering. In this case, the plasma parameter is given by:
$$\Lambda = 4\pi n_\text{e}\lambda_\text{D}^3$$
where

- n_{e} is the number density of electrons,
- λ_{D} is the Debye length.

This expression is typically valid for a plasma in which ion thermal velocities are much less than electron thermal velocities. A detailed discussion of the Coulomb logarithm is available in the NRL Plasma Formulary, pages 34–35.

Note that the word parameter is usually used in plasma physics to refer to bulk plasma properties in general: see plasma parameters.

An alternative definition of this parameter is given by the average number of electrons in a plasma contained within a Debye sphere (a sphere of radius the Debye length). This definition of the plasma parameter is more frequently (and appropriately) called the Debye number, and is denoted $N_\text{D}$. In this context, the plasma parameter is defined as
$$N_\text{D} = \frac{4\pi}{3} n_\text{e}\lambda_\text{D}^3 = \frac{1}{3}\Lambda$$

Since these two definitions differ only by a factor of three, they are frequently used interchangeably.

Often the factor of $\frac{4\pi}{3}$ is dropped. When the Debye length is given by $\lambda_\text{D} = \sqrt{\frac{\varepsilon_0 k_\text{B}T_\text{e}}{n_\text{e}q_\text{e}^2}}$, the plasma parameter is given by
$$N_\text{D} = \frac{{\left(\varepsilon_0 k_\text{B} T_\text{e}\right)}^{3/2}}{q_\text{e}^3 {n_\text{e}}^{1/2}}
= \left(\frac{k_\text{B} T_e}{n_e^{1/3}}\right)^{3/2} \left(\frac{q_e^2}{\varepsilon_0}\right)^{-3/2}$$
where

- ε_{0} is the permittivity of free space,
- k_{B} is the Boltzmann constant,
- q_{e} is the electron charge,
- T_{e} is the electron temperature.

Confusingly, some authors define the plasma parameter as:
$$\varepsilon_p = \Lambda^{-1} .$$

== Coupling parameter ==
A closely related parameter is the plasma coupling $\Gamma$, defined as a ratio of the Coulomb energy to the thermal one:
$$\Gamma = \frac{E_\text{C}}{k_\text{B}T_\text{e}}.$$

The Coulomb energy (per particle) is
$$E_\text{C} = \frac{q_\text{e}^2}{4\pi\varepsilon_0\langle r \rangle},$$
where for the typical inter-particle distance $\langle r \rangle$ usually is taken the Wigner–Seitz radius. Therefore,
$$\Gamma = \frac{q_\text{e}^2}{4\pi\varepsilon_0 k_\text{B}T_\text{e}}\sqrt[3]{\frac{4\pi n_\text{e}}{3}}.$$

Clearly, up to a numeric factor of the order of unity,
$$\Gamma \sim \Lambda^{-2/3}.$$

In general, for multicomponent plasmas one defines the coupling parameter for each species s separately:
$$\Gamma_s = \frac{q_s^2}{4\pi \varepsilon_0 k_\text{B}T_s} \sqrt[3]{\frac{4\pi n_s}{3}}.$$

Here, s stands for either electrons or (a type of) ions.

== The ideal plasma approximation ==
One of the criteria which determine whether a collection of charged particles can rigorously be termed an ideal plasma is that Λ ≫ 1. When this is the case, collective electrostatic interactions dominate over binary collisions, and the plasma particles can be treated as if they only interact with a smooth background field, rather than through pairwise interactions (collisions). The equation of state of each species in an ideal plasma is that of an ideal gas.

== Plasma properties and Λ ==
Depending on the magnitude of Λ, plasma properties can be characterized as following:

Description	Plasma parameter magnitude	
Description	Λ ≪ 1 (Γ ≫ 1)	Λ ≫ 1 (Γ ≪ 1)
Coupling	Strongly coupled plasma	Weakly coupled plasma
Debye sphere	Sparsely populated	Densely populated
Electrostatic influence	Almost continuously	Occasional
Typical characteristic	Cold and dense	Hot and diffuse
Examples	Solid-density laser ablation plasmas Very "cold" "high pressure" arc discharge Inertial fusion experiments Stellar interiors	Ionospheric physics Magnetic fusion devices Space plasma physics Plasma ball
