= Heliotron J =

- Device type: Stellarator
- Location: Japan
- Affiliation: Kyoto University

Technical specifications
- Major radius: 1.2 m (3 ft 11 in)
- Minor radius: 0.1–0.2 m (3.9 in – 7.9 in)
- Magnetic field: 1.5 T (15,000 G)

History
- Year(s) of operation: 2000–present

Links
- Website: Heliotron J at the Institute of Advanced Energy, Kyoto University

Heliotron J is a fusion research device in Japan, specifically a helical-axis heliotron designed to study plasma confinement in this type of device. It is located at the Institute of Advanced Energy of Kyoto University.
