= SCR-1 =

Stellarator of Costa Rica 1
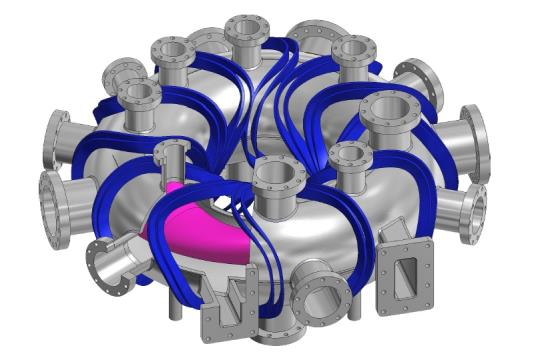
- SCR-1 vacuum vessel and coil structure
- Device type: Stellarator
- Location: Cartago, Costa Rica
- Affiliation: Costa Rica Institute of Technology

Technical specifications
- Major radius: 238.1 mm (device); 140 mm (plasma)
- Minor radius: 100 mm (device); 42.2 mm (plasma)
- Magnetic field: 0.0438 T (438 G)
- Discharge duration: 3 ms
- Plasma current: 40 kA

History
- Year(s) of operation: 2016–present

The Stellarator of Costa Rica 1 (or SCR-1) is a small modular stellarator for the magnetic confinement of plasma located at Cartago, Costa Rica. It is developed by the plasmaTEC group of the Plasma Laboratory for Fusion Energy and Applications at Costa Rica Institute of Technology. It began operation as Latin America's first stellarator on 29 June 2016.

SCR-1 is of a compact design and has the distinction of having the smallest aspect ratio of any operating stellarator device (>4.4). Its design is influenced by the small Spanish stellarator UST-1.

== History ==
In 2010, SCR-1 was originally proposed to be much bigger in size (major radius of 460.33 mm, plasma radius of 42.2 mm) and scale (aspect ratio of 5.7, magnetic field of 0.0878 tesla), and was expected to complete in 2011.

However, the development of SCR-1 took five years (between 2011 and 2015) to complete.
