= Thermal velocity =

Typical velocity of the thermal motion of particles

Thermal velocity or thermal speed is a typical velocity of the thermal motion of particles that make up a gas, liquid, etc. Thus, indirectly, thermal velocity is a measure of temperature. Technically speaking, it is a measure of the width of the peak in the Maxwell–Boltzmann particle velocity distribution. Note that in the strictest sense thermal velocity is not a velocity, since velocity usually describes a vector rather than simply a scalar speed.

== Definitions ==
Since the thermal velocity is only a "typical" velocity, a number of different definitions can be and are used.

Taking $k_\text{B}$ to be the Boltzmann constant, $T$ the absolute temperature, and $m$ the mass of a particle, we can write the different thermal velocities:

=== In one dimension ===
If $v_\text{th}$ is defined as the root mean square of the velocity in any one dimension (i.e. any single direction), then $v_\text{th} = \sqrt{\frac{k_\text{B} T}{m}}.$

If $v_\text{th}$ is defined as the mean of the magnitude of the velocity in any one dimension (i.e. any single direction), then $v_\text{th} = \sqrt{\frac{2 k_\text{B} T}{\pi m}}.$

=== In three dimensions ===
If $v_\text{th}$ is defined as the most probable speed, then $v_\text{th} = \sqrt{\frac{2k_\text{B} T}{m}}.$

If $v_\text{th}$ is defined as the root mean square of the total velocity, then $v_\text{th} = \sqrt{\frac{3k_\text{B} T}{m}}.$

If $v_\text{th}$ is defined as the mean of the magnitude of the velocity of the atoms or molecules, then $v_\text{th} = \sqrt{\frac{8k_\text{B} T}{\pi m}}.$

All of these definitions are in the range $v_\text{th} = (1.6 \pm 0.2) \sqrt{\frac{k_\text{B} T}{m}}.$

== Thermal velocity at room temperature ==
At 20 °C (293.15 kelvins), the mean thermal velocity of common gasses in three dimensions is:

Gas	Thermal velocity
Hydrogen	1,754 m/s (5,750 ft/s)
Helium	1,245 m/s (4,080 ft/s)
Water vapor	585 m/s (1,920 ft/s)
Nitrogen	470 m/s (1,500 ft/s)
Air	464 m/s (1,520 ft/s)
Argon	394 m/s (1,290 ft/s)
Carbon dioxide	375 m/s (1,230 ft/s)
