= Mirnov oscillations =

Magnetic field fluctuations in an ionised gas

Mirnov oscillations (a.k.a. magnetic oscillations) are amplitude perturbations of the magnetic field in a plasma. It is named after Sergei V. Mirnov who designed a probe to measure these oscillations in 1965. The probe name is Mirnov coil.

Mirnov oscillations have been extensively studied in tokamaks as they provide information about the plasma instabilities that occur within the system. The instabilities create local fluctuations in the current which induce a varying magnetic flux density, and are picked up by the coils due to Faraday's law of induction.
