= Flux surface =

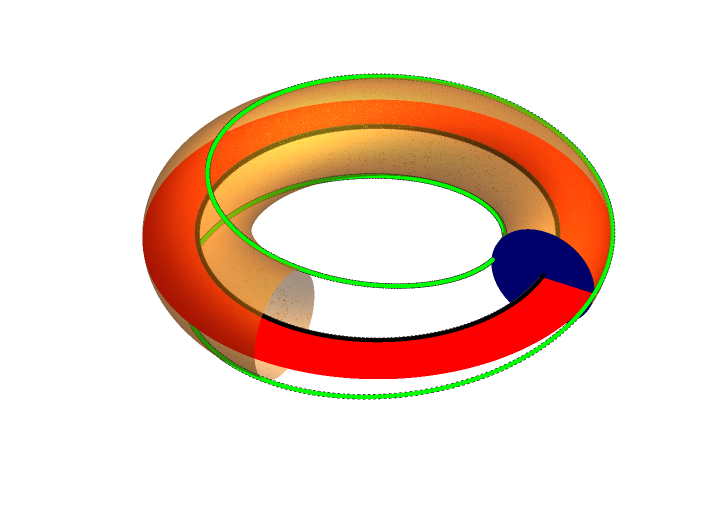
A part of a flux surface (yellow), and the magnetic axis (black). The magnetic flux passing through the red and blue surface is called the poloidal and toroidal flux, respectively. There is furthermore a rational magnetic field line (green) on the flux surface.

In magnetic confinement fusion, a flux surface is a surface on which magnetic field lines lie. Since the magnetic field is divergence-free (and magnetic nulls are undesirable), the Poincaré–Hopf theorem implies that such a surface must be either a torus, or a knot. In the tokamak and the stellarator flux surfaces have toroidal shapes, whereas the more exotic knotatron has a knotted flux surface. Flux surfaces are typically characterized by the poloidal magnetic flux or the toroidal magnetic flux. The poloidal flux is the magnetic flux passing through a ribbon going from the magnetic axis (the centre of the device) to the flux surface, and the toroidal flux is the magnetic flux passing through a circle which encloses the magnetic axis. The total flux passing through flux surface itself is zero, as magnetic field lines are everywhere tangent to the surface.

Flux surfaces can either be rational or irrational, depending on the behavior of magnetic field lines on the flux surface. Rational surfaces have magnetic field lines which are periodic; the magnetic field line closes back on itself. Conversely irrational surfaces have magnetic field lines which do not close back on themselves, and a magnetic field line traces out the entire flux surface (the magnetic field line comes arbitrarily close to each point on the flux surface). Rational magnetic surfaces are very sensitive to perturbations and can degenerate into magnetic islands. Flux surfaces are not guaranteed to exist; the magnetic field line can fill a volume chaotically. The theory of magnetic field lines in toroidal systems is closely related to the theory of 2-dimensional Hamiltonian systems.
