= Hybrid Illinois Device for Research and Applications =

Toroidal magnetic fusion device

HIDRA
Hybrid Illinois Device for Research and Applications
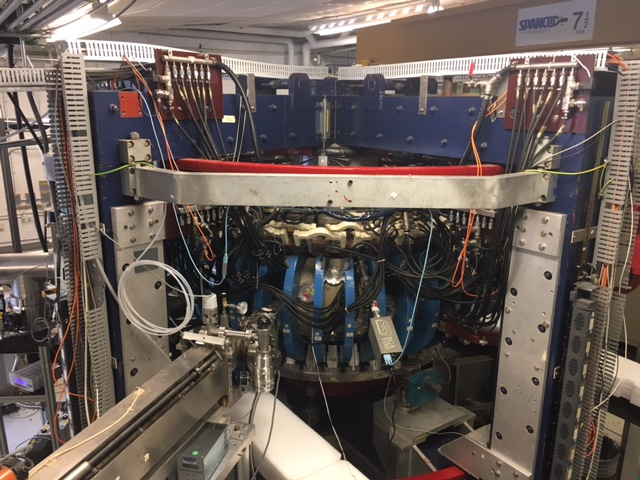
- The completed HIDRA device at the University of Illinois Urbana–Champaign (photo: Daniel Andruczyk)
- Device type: Stellarator, Tokamak
- Location: Urbana, Illinois, US
- Affiliation: University of Illinois at Urbana–Champaign

Technical specifications
- Major radius: 0.72 m (2 ft 4 in)
- Minor radius: 0.19 m (7.5 in)
- Magnetic field: < 0.5 T (5,000 G)
- Heating power: 26 kW (2.45 GHz magnetron, ohmic heating)

History
- Year(s) of operation: 1972 – 1982 (as WEGA, Grenoble); 1982 – 2000 (as WEGA, Stuttgart); 2001 – 2013 (as WEGA, Greifswald); 2014 – present (as HIDRA, Urbana, Illinois)

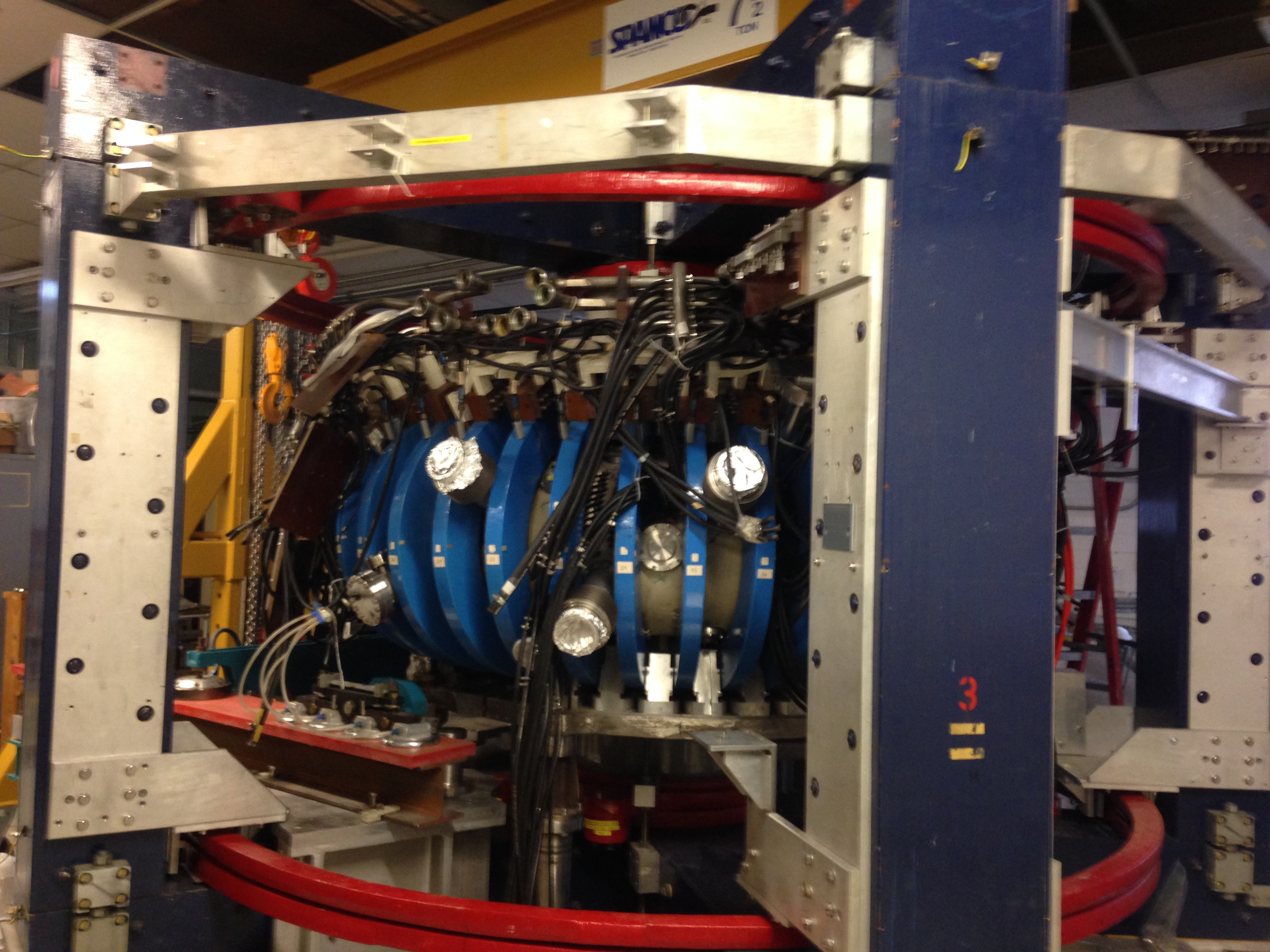
HIDRA being assembled as of December 2014 (photo: Daniel Andruczyk)

The Hybrid Illinois Device for Research and Applications (HIDRA) is a medium-sized toroidal magnetic fusion device housed in the Nuclear Radiation Laboratory and operated by the Center for Plasma-Material Interactions (CPMI) within the Department of Nuclear, Plasma and Radiological Engineering at the University of Illinois at Urbana–Champaign, United States. HIDRA had its first plasma at the end of April 2016 and started experimental campaigns by December of that year. HIDRA is the former WEGA classical stellarator that was operated at the Max Planck Institute for Plasma Physics in Greifswald Germany from 2001 to 2013.

A unique aspect of HIDRA is that it can operate as a stellarator and as a tokamak, hence the hybrid designation. In fact, it should be possible to operate the two modes simultaneously. It operates up to 15 minutes of continuous plasma, with up to 60 minutes in the future and will concentrate on understanding the complex relationship between the plasma and materials inside the vacuum vessel of a fusion device and specifically will concentrate in understanding the complex behavior that flowing liquid metal walls, and in particular liquid lithium, have as plasma-facing materials in such devices. This makes HIDRA one of only a very few fusion devices willing to run liquid lithium as a plasma-facing material (PFM). Others include NSTX, LTX, EAST, T-11M, RFX, FTU and TJ-II.

== History ==
Some argue that HIDRA is the "most well traveled fusion device in the world". From its beginnings in France, it has operated in 4 cities in 3 countries. The research goals of the device have dramatically changed over the years, from doing wave heating studies to being a testbed for one of the world's most sophisticated fusion devices, and now to studying the way plasmas interact with the inside wall and materials of fusion devices. In fact, it will be the first toroidal fusion-relevant device that will be solely dedicated to the study of plasma wall (PWI), plasma surface (PSI) and plasma material interactions (PMI).

=== Centre d’Etudes Nucléaires (1972–1982) ===
HIDRA, started off as a different machine at the Centre d’Etudes Nucléaires in Grenoble, France in 1972. Back then it was called WEGA with construction of the device from 1972 to 1975. WEGA was a joint project between CEA Grenoble and the Max Planck Institute for Plasma Physics in Germany to study RF heating and lower hybrid heating. There were three vacuum vessel that were built, two tokamak and a single stellarator. WEGA primarily operated as a tokamak from 1975 to 1987 despite plans to install the stellarator vessel in 1976 (repairs were needed on the helical coil insulation). Electron and ion temperatures achieved were, T_{e} = 600 – 900 eV and, T_{i} = 150 – 250 eV. Densities of n_{e} = 1.6×10^{19} m^{−3} with a plasma current of I_{P} = 45 – 60 kA and heating power, P_{ohm} = 100 – 130 kW and, P_{RF} = 100 kW. Typical pulse duration was, Δt = 5 – 15 ms and an energy confinement time, τ_{E} = 3 – 5 ms.

WEGA was then converted over to a "classical Stellarator" design with the toroidal coils kept in place and a new vacuum vessel with four helical coils winding around the vessel. It was operated as a Stellarator until 1982 when it moved to the University of Stuttgart, in the then West Germany.

=== Institut für Plasmaforschung (1982–2000) ===
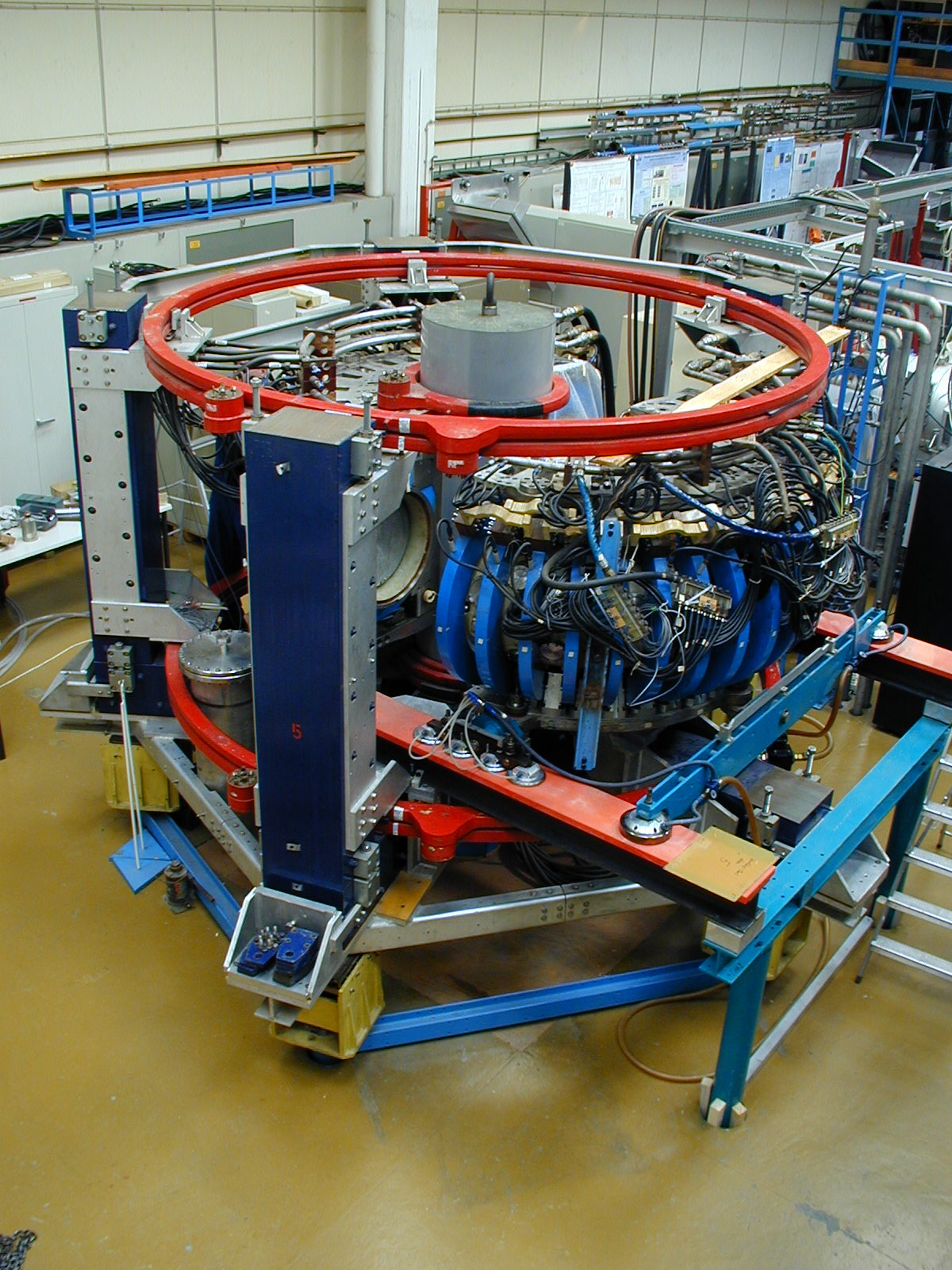
The WEGA stellarator being assembled at IPF Stuttgart (photo: Courtesy of IPP Greifswald)

In 1982 WEGA moved from Grenoble to the University of Stuttgart in Germany. Unfortunately in Stuttgart it seems that WEGA was not used much. There is not a lot of information from this time and it is very difficult to see what results came out of this 18-year time period. The issues seem to be a lack of enough heating power and cooling. However, IPF did have the stellarator vacuum vessel installed and some of the first magnetic flux surface measurements were performed.

=== Max-Planck-Institut für Plasmaphysik (2001–2013) ===
From 2000 to 2001 WEGA moved from Stuttgart to Greifswald. At this stage a new institute had been built in the former East German city to stimulate economic, scientific and educational growth in the region. MPIPP Greifswald was designated to house the brand new modular stellarator W7-X. While W7-X was being built WEGA was brought in to be the machine where much of the diagnostic, heating and control work for W7-X would be tested and perfected. It also provided a valuable tool in the training and teaching of future generations of fusion and plasma scientists and engineers. In fact, though the name was the same the acronym for WEGA changed to "Wendelstein Experiment in Greifswald für Ausbildung" the Wendelstein experiment in Greifswald for Training.

WEGA's magnetic coil systems were run via transformer and rectifier sets that allowed steady state operations. This made WEGA unique among the smaller toroidal fusion devices that normally are pulsed, and only the larger devices such as LHD and W7-X have that kind of steady state capability. Some of the achievements on WEGA include the development of an OXB heating scheme that allows ECRH heating above the cut off density for the electrons in the plasma. This allowed densities almost 100 times higher to be achieved, where temperatures were on average around T_{e} = 15 eV and densities around n_{e} ~ 10^{18} m^{−3}. Ion temperatures around T_{i} = 1-2 eV. The W7-X control system was tested on WEGA showing the real time capability of measuring plasma parameters and control of the machine. It was demonstrated, that despite being a stellarator, a plasma current could be driven via microwave heating of the plasma.

Furthermore, a heavy ion beam probe (HIBP) was also developed for the measurement of radial profiles of the electric plasma potential. In 2013 the last experiments were performed and WEGA was slowly decommissioned as operations for W7-X started to ramp up. WEGA was either going to be scrapped or if a suitable research group was found would be donated. In the Fall of 2013 a suitable donor was found, the University of Illinois at Urbana-Champaign, and details for the transfer were completed in the summer of 2014.

=== Center for Plasma Material-Interactions (2014–present) ===
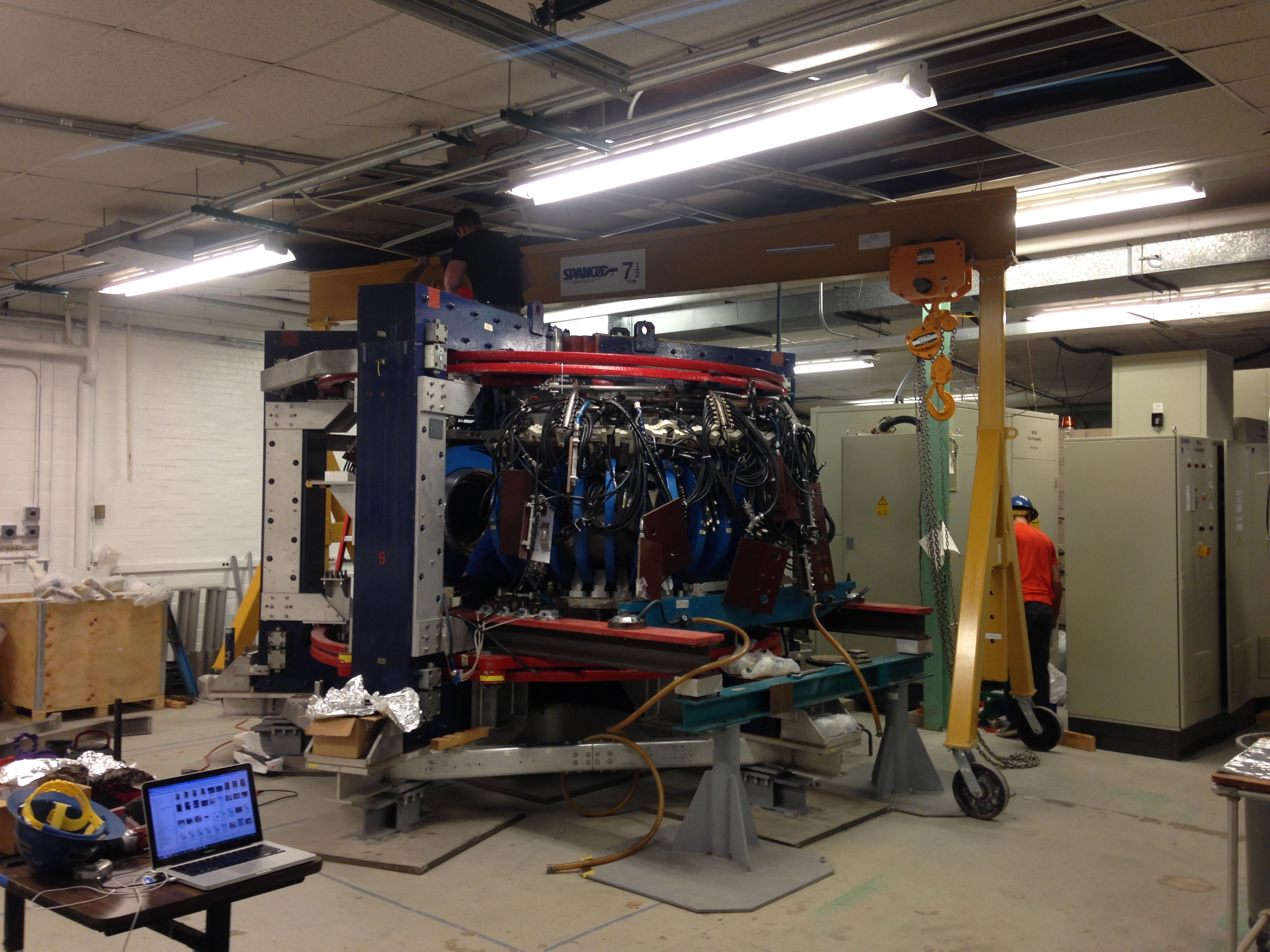
HIDRA being assembled at the University of Illinois Urbana–Champaign (photo: Daniel Andruczyk)

With W7-X operations starting in 2014, the space occupied by WEGA and its power systems was taking up much needed real-estate for the Thomson Scattering system and a cryogenic pellet injection system. During the 2013 SOFE conference, Daniel Andruczyk, a former Post-Doc on WEGA, met with some former colleagues and it was suggested that the University of Illinois could potentially take WEGA to the USA. After a year of negotiating between the director of the Center for Plasma Material Interactions, David Ruzic, the university and IPP, the funds were secured to make it happen. Andruczyk was brought on to lead the project of dismantling and shipping WEGA to the Urbana-Champaign Campus in Illinois. Upon arrival the Machine was renamed the Hybrid Illinois Device for Research and Applications. The Hybrid part being that it still has the tokamak capabilities, not only the stellarator ones.

It took nearly 8 weeks over the autumn of 2014 of dismantling the device in Germany and was packed and shipped to the US in October. By early 4 November shipping containers worth of fusion device arrived by flat bed-truck to the University of Illinois at the Center for Plasma Material Interactions. Aside from lab personnel, the universities facilities and services division were heavily involved in helping to off load, move in and assemble much of the larger, heavier components. Construction began in earnest with the transformers and rectifiers for the helical and toroidal magnetic coils moving in first. Once these were established then the base was brought in and the yokes, center-stack, half-tori and vertical field coils all installed over the next ten days.

HIDRA foremost is an educational tool for training future fusion scientists and engineers. Everything with the machine is done such that students can use it. The control system was written by senior undergrad and grad students and allows the machine to be controlled from one computer via a LabView program. This also sends out the trigger signals that are needed to fire the various data acquisition and diagnostic systems. HIDRA essentially can be controlled and run by a single person.

== Applications ==
=== First Plasma (2016) ===
In April 2016, HIDRA had its first plasma, a simple glow plasma discharge, during the Nuclear, Plasma and Radiological Engineering Departments Open house. With nearly 100 dignitaries and guests including the head of the NPRE department and Dean of the Grainger College of Engineering, the HIDRA team was able to demonstrate that all the working components of the device were installed and running and that operations were able to begin. A short 120 s plasma discharge was initiated around 4 pm demonstrating the machines operational capabilities. HIDRA was shut down for 3 months after that for further device installation and commissioning. Once the upgrades and installations were complete the first set of characterization experiments verifying the performance of the magnets and HIDRA operations.

=== Flux Surface Measurements (2017 - 2018) ===
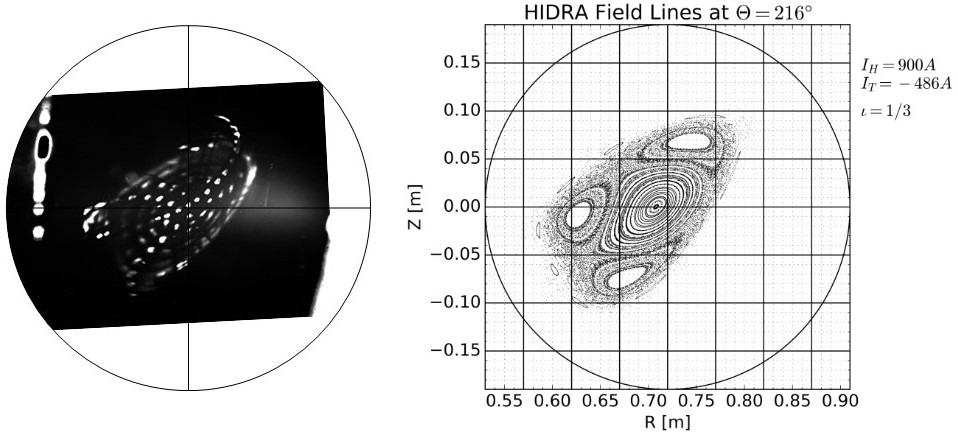
iota = 1/3 magnetic flux surfaces showing the islands (photo: Daniel Andruczyk)

The first set of data was the characterization of the magnetic flux lines on the machine. This used an in-house electron beam and fluorescing rod method, which was originally developed on WEGA for W7-X, to see what the magnetic field shape, and thus plasma shape, would look like. The beam would be scanned across the minor radius of the vacuum vessel and the rod swept through the vessel. Anywhere an electron beam hit the rod it would light up. a sensitive astronomical camera was used to image the flux surfaces and compare them to a ray-tracing code to see the validity of the plasma and any error fields present. Some gas could also be bled in to visually see the electron beams themselves.

There are two DC magnetic probes used to monitor the magnetic field. There is a static probe that is situated at the edge of the vessel. This is used to monitor the magnetic field during the plasma discharge. There is a second DC magnetic probe mounted on a reciprocating probe in vacuum that allows radial scans of the magnetic field (without plasma). The probe itself is rotatable which allow horizontal, vertical and helical magnetic fields to be measured. This probe is mainly used in the Fall Semester of the university year during a plasma laboratory class to understand how magnetic fields affect plasmas.

An interesting effect of the HIDRA magnetic field operation is that the helical field can be ramped down while the toroidal field is kept constant, and injecting an electron beam, can visualize the $\nabla B$ drift of electrons.

=== Magnetron Plasmas (2018 - Present) ===
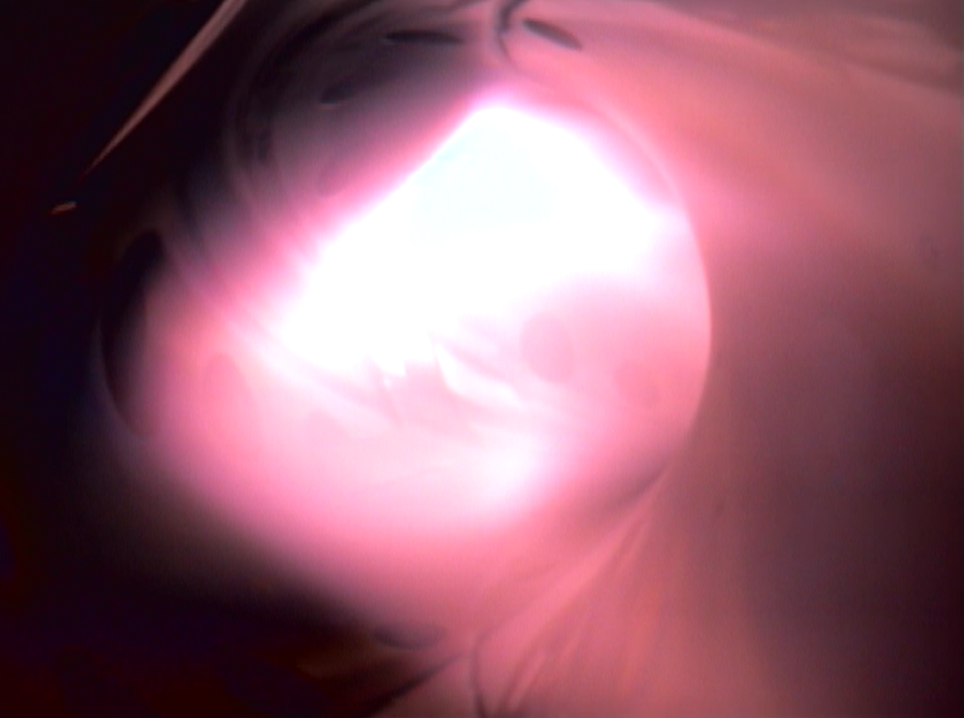
First plasma in HIDRA. This is with helium as the gas (photo: Daniel Andruczyk).

With most of 2017 and parts of 2018 being taken up with flux surface measurements and figuring out machine operation, the first magnetron plasmas were initiated at the end of 2018. A 2.45 GHz magnetron system is used to do generate electron cyclotron resonantly heated plasmas. Currently only the 6 kW system is operation, however this is enough to generate plasmas with electron temperatures on the order of T_{E} = 10 – 20 eV and plasma densities up to n_{e} = 13×10^{18} m^{−3}. Ion temperatures have been measured using doppler broadening of the helium ion line and are typically around 10% of the electron temperature. There is a 20 kW magnetron system that will be available in future once commissioned.

From 2016 to 2019, HIDRA and CPMI was part of international collaboration to develop liquid lithium systems for long pulsed plasma operation. Confirming the magnetic flux surfaces and also magnetron operation was part of developing liquid metal technologies and was done in together with several labs around the US and China.

The system is designed for steady state operation. The shortest duration plasma pulses currently are t = 40 s with flat top durations of t_{flat} = 20 s. A typical experimental run has 5 seconds of no magnetic field with a 5 s ramp up to the desired field strengths. At the end of a pulse there is a 5 s ramp down and a further 5 s of no field. The longest duration plasma discharges currently run at 1000 s. These now are run quite routinely in HIDRA and are integral to the PMI experiments being performed. A typical plasma power run on HIDRA is anywhere from 1.2 kW < P_{heat} < 5.4 kW.

A fast reciprocating arm with a Langmuir probe is used to measure radial profiles of the electron temperature, T_{e}, electron density, n_{e}, floating potential V_{f} and plasma potential V_{P}. Taking a measurement and saving the data takes approximately 52s. In a 1000 s discharge roughly 18 radial profile measurements can be taken to get a spatial and temporal profile of the plasma. This is to compliment and benchmark the spectroscopic collisional radiative model (CRM) technique used to also measure density and temperature.

=== HIDRA Material Analysis Teststand (HIDRA-MAT) (2019 - present) ===
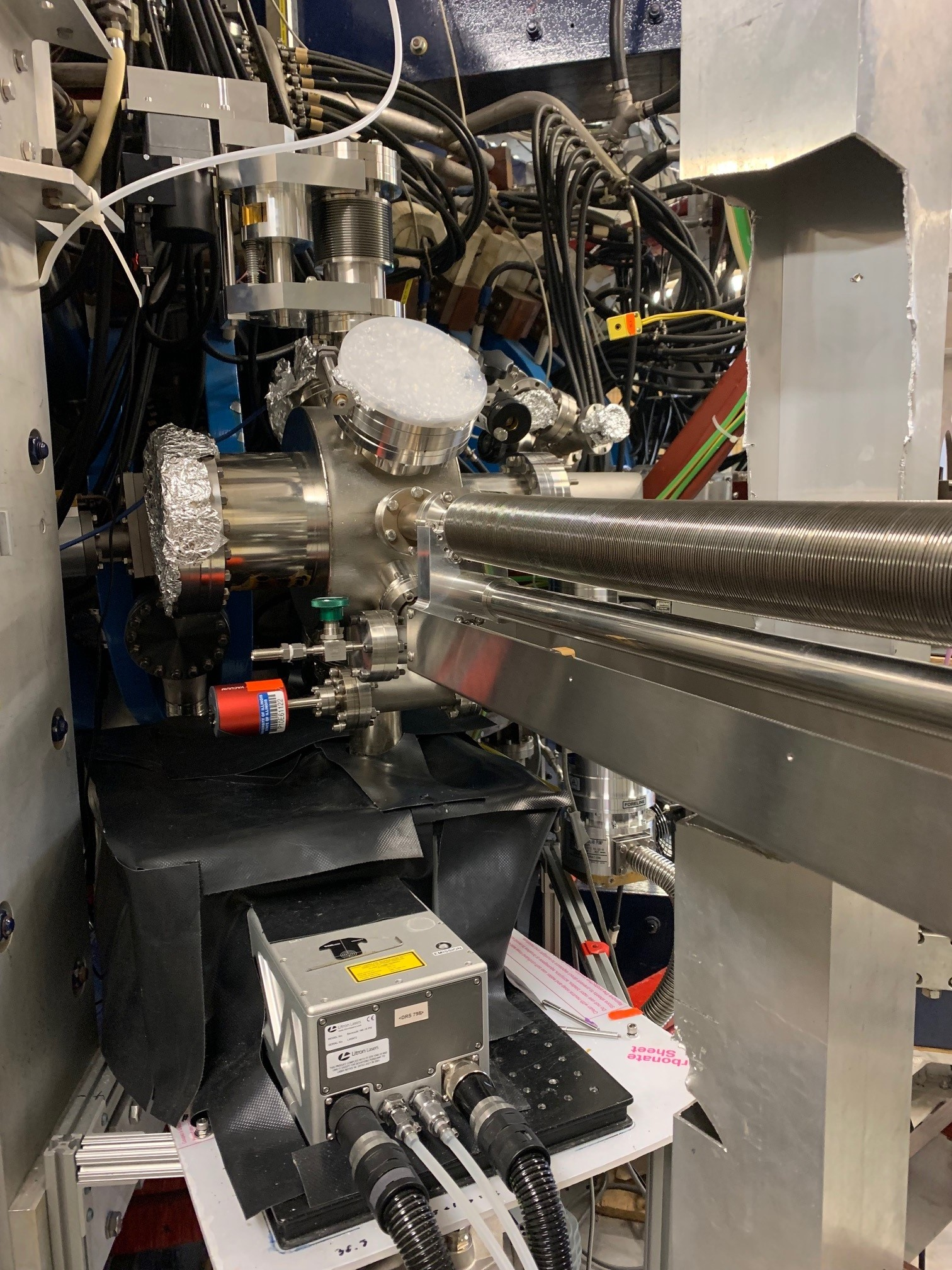
The HIDRA Material Analysis Teststand (HIDRA-MAT) installed on HIDRA. This allows some surface characterization in-vacuo. The LIBS laser can be seen as well as the transfer arm.

In 2019 the HIDRA Material Analysis Teststand (HIDRA-MAT) was commissioned and the first exposures of tungsten samples were performed. HIDRA-MAT was designed to be able to do surface characterization without having to break vacuum, that is in-vacuo measurements. This ability allows study of the temporal evolution of the surface as well. HIDRA-MAT was based on the Material Analysis Particle Probe (MAPP) that has been successfully used on LTX and NSTX. The system head allows material samples to be mounted securely and exposed to the HIDRA plasma. The probe head can be heated to 1000 °C and is attached to a translational stage that has a stroke of 800 mm. The Probe head also can be rotated from +90° to -90°. when in the +90° position a liquid lithium injector can place a controlled droplet of liquid lithium onto the material surface. The probe then can be rotated back to 0° and inserted into the plasma. Furthermore, when in the -45° position, this allows the surface to be exposed to the LIBS/LIDS laser.

Retention studies of the surface with the plasma fuel gas can be performed. For example, is running a D_{2} + He plasma, and a tungsten surface, the sample can be heated to do thermal desorption spectroscopy (TDS) measurements. To distinguish between the two gases (mass 4 for both) a dual RGA system has been developed that allows one gas to be subtracted from the other.

=== Plasma Material Interaction (PMI) and Lithium Operations (2020 - present) ===
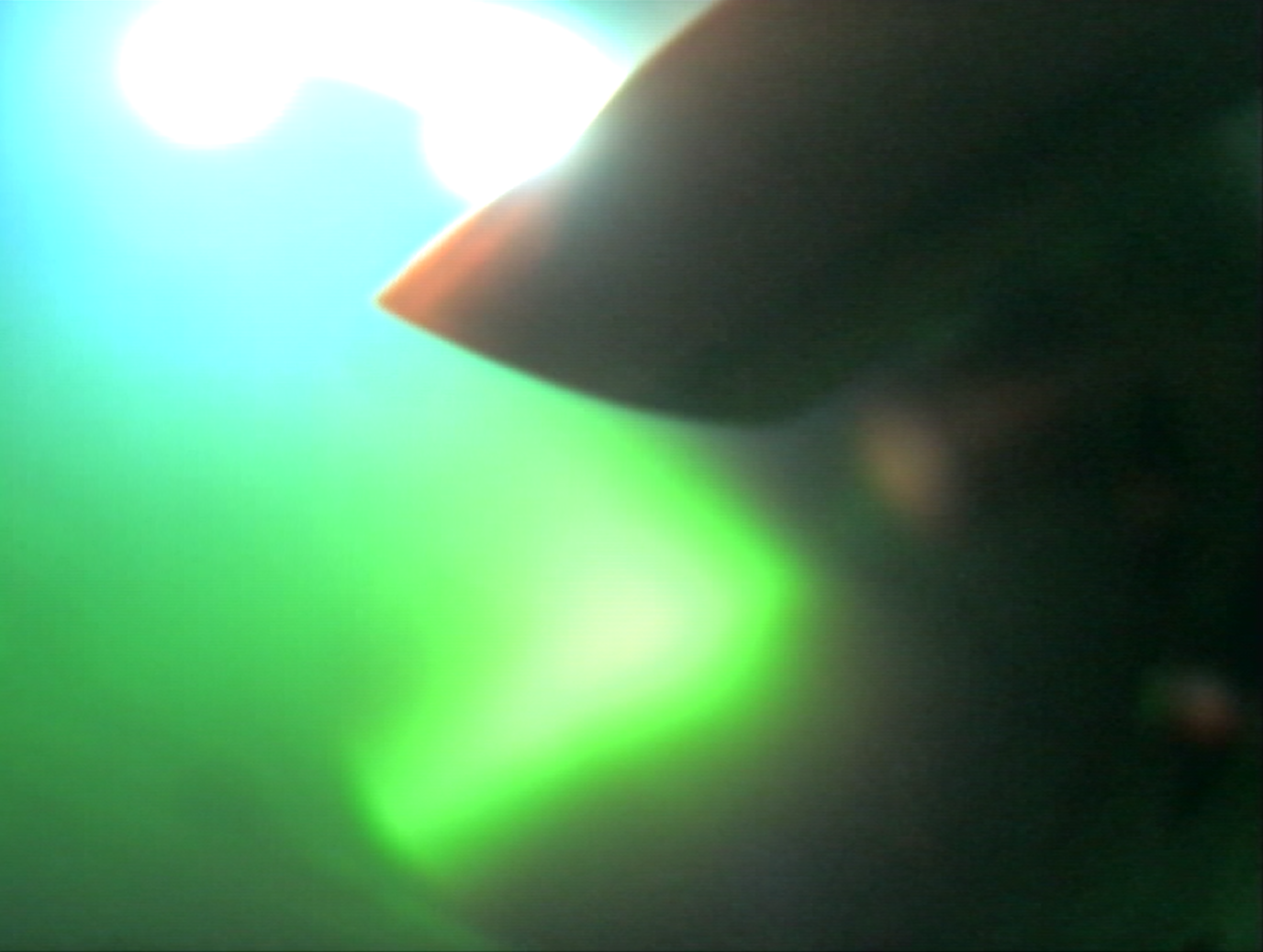
HIDRA operations with lithium. This is shot# 3381 in the March 2021 campaign (photo: Daniel Andruczyk).

The first plasma operations with liquid lithium were performed in March 2021. This was done via a tungsten substrate mounted on HIDRA-MAT and a drop of lithium, m_{Li} = 100 mg, places on it surface. This was inserted into a 600 s, 5.4 kW plasma and exposed at the scrape off layer edge in a $\iota$ = 1/4 plasma, near an island. Initial PMI was observed and eventually all the lithium was evaporated off the surface. However once the lithium interacted with the plasma and was ionized, the background helium gas which was being recycled off the wall disappeared despite a constant flow of helium into the HIDRA vacuum chamber. The effect was that the plasma temperature went from T_{e} = 18 eV to over T_{e} = 50 eV. The temperature on the surface of HIDRA-MAT spiked to over 2000 °C, and the molybdenum clips were melted. a corner of the ECRH antenna which was exposed to the plasma also melted die to the increased PMI.

The mechanism for how the helium is being pumped out by the lithium is yet unknown. Thus, in November 2021 a new lithium campaign was undertaken to try and get a better understanding of what is going on. Future studies in 2022 will also be performed with hydrogen, deuterium and H_{2}/He mixture plasmas. These studies are an important part of the Domestic Liquid Metal PFC Program that has been undertaken by PPPL, ORNL and UIUC. One of the main areas of concern is the retention of hydrogenic species and helium pumping with liquid lithium. HIDRA along with HIDRA-MAT has the capabilities to explore this.

Plasma material interactions (PMI) play a pivotal role in fusion reactor operation and it's critical to have a dedicated toroidal machine to study these phenomena. It is anticipated that HIDRA will be able to reach the necessary conditions to study tungsten fuzz (W-fuzz). Already, under some conditions, precursors to fuzz formation have been observed. The long pulse aspect of HIDRA means that the required fluences needed for W-fuzz formation can be achieved. Plasma chemistry is another critical aspect that needs to be studied. This not only can lead to molecules that are detrimental to fusion operation, but also dust formation, re-deposition of material around the machine and "UFO's" formation. In fusion studies UFO's do refer to "unidentified flying objects" which are seen as sparks and bright spots that can form and travel around the vacuum vessel. These sometimes will be trapped on the field lines and sometimes are not. Their origin usually is not seen and just by viewing them on camera cannot determine what they are. Hence the "UFO" designation. During the lithium experiments on HIDRA in 2021, such UFO's were observed.
