= Shoichi Yoshikawa =

American physicist (born 1934)

- Born: 9 April 1934; Tokyo, Japan
- Died: November 4, 2010 (aged 76)
- Education: University of Tokyo (B.S.); Massachusetts Institute of Technology (Ph.D., 1961)
- Known for: Spherator; Princeton Large Torus; JT-60 tokamak Heliac
- Awards: Mainichi Shinbun Award
- Scientific career
- Fields: Plasma physics
- Workplaces: Princeton Plasma Physics Laboratory; University of Tokyo

Shoichi Yoshikawa (born 1934 in Tokyo, Japan) was a Japanese-American physicist. He was full professor at the University of Tokyo and Lecturer with Rank of Professor in the Astrophysics Department of Princeton University. He was also a scientist at the United States Department of Energy Princeton Plasma Physics Laboratory (PPPL). His main interests were plasma physics and fusion physics, particularly magnetic confinement fusion.

In the 1960s, he was leader of the Model C stellarator experiment at PPPL. After the Soviet Union presented record-breaking results on its T-3 tokamak in 1968, Yoshikawa was one of the first advocates of the tokamak device type in the US. Shortly after, PPPL converted the Model C to the US's first tokamak, the Symmetrical Tokamak, Yoshikawa proposed the construction of a larger successor, which became the Princeton Large Torus. He increased the relative width of the plasma vessel in the donut-shaped tokamak, a feature that was adopted worldwide.

He was appointed professor at the University of Tokyo and returned to Japan between 1973 and 1976, where he advanced the project to build Japan's first large tokamak, JT-60. He subsequently returned to Princeton as Lecturer with Rank of Professor.

In 1983, he proposed the heliac configuration, a particularly simple stellarator with only circular coils. The first heliac was SHEILA, built at ANU in Australia in 1985. It was later followed by the flexible heliac H-1NF. A flexible heliac was also built at CIEMAT in Spain from 1991, TJ-II.

He was elected a Fellow of the American Physical Society. He retired from Princeton University in 2000. His daughter Mako Yoshikawa is a novelist. She wrote a book about her father and his fusion physics work, Secrets of the Sun.
