= Maingi =

Maingi is a surname. Notable people with the surname include:

- Herman Kingori Maingi (1920–2009), Kenyan farmer
- Mary Maingi (fl. from 2003), Kenyan politician
- Rajesh Maingi (fl. from 1999), physicist
- Ruth Ndulu Maingi (born 1983), Kenyan actress
