= Mark Hersam =

American materials scientist

Mark C. Hersam
- Mark C. Hersam
- Born: January 31, 1975 (age 51); Downers Grove, Illinois, U.S.
- Education: University of Illinois at Urbana-Champaign; University of Cambridge
- Known for: Density gradient ultracentrifugation (DGU) of carbon nanotubes Contributions in the fields of nanotechnology and nanochemistry.
- Awards: Materials Research Society Outstanding Young Investigator Award (2010); SES Research Young Investigator Award, Electrochemical Society (2010); Peter Mark Memorial Award (2006); TMS Robert Lansing Hardy Award (2006); Presidential Early Career Award for Scientists and Engineers (2005)
- Scientific career
- Fields: Chemistry, Materials Science and Engineering
- Workplaces: Northwestern University
- Thesis: Silicon-based molecular nanotechnology: Fabrication and characterization with the scanning tunneling microscope (2000)
- Doctoral advisor: Joseph W. Lyding
- Doctoral students: Nathan Guisinger

Mark Christopher Hersam (born January 31, 1975) is a professor of Chemistry and Materials Science Engineering at Northwestern University (2000–present) who, according to the National Science Foundation, has made "major breakthrough[s]" in the field of nanotechnology. He is a 2014 recipient of the MacArthur "Genius" Award and a 1996 Marshall Scholar. He is also an Executive Editor of ACS Nano. As of October 2023, he has been cited over 68,000 times according to Google Scholar.

== Education and early academic work ==
=== Education ===
Mark Christopher Hersam attended Downers Grove South High School in Downers Grove, IL where he was Valedictorian and an Eagle Scout. He then went on to receive his B.S. in electrical engineering at the University of Illinois at Urbana-Champaign in 1996. Upon winning the Marshall Scholarship, Hersam received a M.Phil. in Microelectronic Engineering and Semiconductor Physics from the University of Cambridge in 1997. His Ph.D. was granted from the Electrical Engineering Department at the University of Illinois at Urbana-Champaign in 2000.

=== Early work ===
While at UIUC, Hersam did research under David Ruzic in the Nuclear Engineering Department and Professor Joseph Lyding in the Electrical Engineering Department.

After graduating from UIUC, Hersam was an intern at the Argonne National Laboratory where he did research in the Energy Technology Division studying the energy-related applications of surface acoustic-wave-based sensing.

While at Cambridge University, Hersam was advised by Mark Welland and the two co-authored the paper "Potentiometry and repair of electrically stressed nanowires using atomic force microscopy" in the journal of Applied Physics Letters.

As a doctoral candidate, Hersam again worked with Professor Joseph Lyding at the Beckman Institute where they studied "atomic level manipulation and silicon-based molecular nanotechnology."

== Research ==
As head of the Hersam Group at Northwestern University, Hersam has authored more than 600 peer-reviewed publications studying hybrid hard and soft nanoscale materials for applications in information technology, biotechnology, nanotechnology, and alternative energy.

== Corporate connections and applications ==
- Co-founder of NanoIntegris
- Intern at IBM Nanoscience

== Honors and achievements ==
=== Honors ===
- Teacher of the Year in the Department of Materials Science and Engineering, Northwestern University 2003, 2007, 2009, 2010
- Materials Research Society Outstanding Young Investigator Award, 2010
- SES Research Young Investigator Award, Electrochemical Society, 2010
- Senior Member, Institute of Electrical and Electronics Engineers, 2009
- Young Alumni Achievement Award, ECE Department, UIUC, 2007
- AVS Peter Mark Memorial Award, 2006
- TMS Robert Lansing Hardy Award, 2006
- Presidential Early Career Award for Scientists and Engineers, 2005
- Office of Naval Research Young Investigator Award, 2005
- Army Research Office Young Investigator Award, 2005
- Alfred P. Sloan Research Fellowship, 2005
- Northwestern University Associated Student Government Faculty Honor Roll, 2004
- National Science Foundation CAREER Award, 2002
- Arnold and Mabel Beckman Foundation, Beckman Young Investigators Award, 2001
- Gregory Stillman Semiconductor Research Award, 2000
- American Vacuum Society Graduate Research Award, 1999

=== Scholarships ===
- Searle Center for Teaching Excellence Junior Fellow, 2001
- IBM Distinguished Fellowship, 1999
- Koehler Graduate Fellowship, 1998
- National Science Foundation Graduate Fellowship, 1997
- British Marshall Scholarship, 1996

== Professional organizations and societies ==
- Co-chair of the NSF International Study of Nanoscale Science and Engineering, 2009–
- AVS Nanometer-scale Science and Technology Division Executive Board Member, 2003–2005, 2007–2009
- Review of Scientific Instruments Editorial Board Member, 2001–2003
- Nanopatterning Synergistic Research Group Leader, Nanoscale Science and Engineering Center, 2001–
- Director of the Nanoscale Science and Engineering Center Research Experience for Undergraduates, 2001–
- National Science Foundation SBIR, IMR/MRI, MRSEC and NUE Panelist
- Member of IEEE, MRS, AVS, AIP, APS, ACS, TMS, ASEE, AAAS

In 2016, he was selected as a U.S. Science Envoy by the United States State Department.

== Selected works ==
- 2006 -Sorting carbon nanotubes by electronic structure using density differentiation, MS Arnold, AA Green, JF Hulvat, SI Stupp, MC Hersam, Nature nanotechnology 1 (1), 60–65
- 2014 - Emerging device applications for semiconducting two-dimensional transition metal dichalcogenides, D Jariwala, VK Sangwan, LJ Lauhon, TJ Marks, MC Hersam, ACS nano 8 (2), 1102-1120
- 2015 - Synthesis of borophenes: Anisotropic, two-dimensional boron polymorphs, AJ Mannix, XF Zhou, B Kiraly, JD Wood, D Alducin, BD Myers, X Liu, Science 350 (6267), 1513-1516

== Personal life ==
Hersam hosts Undergraduate Research Experience opportunity for students each summer.

== See also ==
Notable Carbon Nanotube Scientists:

- Richard Smalley
- Sumio Iijima
- Phaedon Avouris

Notable Northwestern University Professors:

- Chad Mirkin
- Tobin J. Marks
