= Boronization =

Boronization is a wall conditioning technique for fusion machines (such as tokamaks), where a thin film of boron is deposited on the walls of the vacuum vessel in order to reduce the impurity content (for example oxygen) in the vacuum which can be deleterious for fusion plasma operation.

This technique can be seen as a plasma-assisted chemical vapor deposition of boron. The typical workflow involves performing a glow discharge and injecting a gas containing boron into the vacuum vessel chamber.

Boronization as a wall conditioning technique was first developed for the TEXTOR tokamak at the Forschungszentrum Jülich. It is now a well-established technique and has been successfully applied on many machines, examples include DIII-D and ASDEX.

Real-time boron powder injection is an advanced technique that offers several advantages over traditional boronization. This method involves injecting submillimeter boron powder directly into the plasma during operation, where it evaporates and deposits a thin boron layer on plasma-facing surfaces. Unlike earlier approaches, it avoids the use of toxic diborane gas and allows continuous conditioning without interrupting plasma operations. This approach is particularly valuable in long-pulse or steady-state devices, where traditional coatings may degrade quickly, helping to maintain wall integrity and limit impurities entering the plasma. It has been studied in many devices like ASDEX Upgrade and DIII-D and is now also being considered as a routine procedure for ITER.

A consequence of the repeated boronization procedures will be the accumulation of boron on the first wall and in the divertor regions of tokamak devices, as well as the mixing of boron with plasma-facing materials. The properties of the formed mixtures can differ significantly from the original wall-material, which may lead to unwanted side-effects of the boronization such as the retention of plasma fuel species in the walls of the reactor.

== See also ==
- Glow discharge
- Sputtering
- Plasma surface interaction
- Plasma-facing material
