= L-H mode transition =

Low to High Confinement Mode Transition, more commonly referred to as L-H transition, is a phenomenon in the fields of plasma physics and magnetic confinement fusion, signifying the transition from less efficient plasma confinement to highly efficient modes. The L-H transition, a milestone in the development of nuclear fusion, enables the confinement of high-temperature plasmas (ionized gases at extremely high temperatures). The transition is dependent on many factors such as density, magnetic field strength, heating method, plasma fueling, and edge plasma control, and is made possible through mechanisms such as edge turbulence, E×B shear, edge electric field, and edge current and plasma flow. Researchers studying this field use tools such as Electron Cyclotron Emission, Thomson Scattering, magnetic diagnostics, and Langmuir probes to gauge the PLH (energy needed for the transition) and seek to lower this value. This confinement is a necessary condition for sustaining the fusion reactions, which involve the combination of atomic nuclei, leading to the release of vast amounts of energy.

== Background ==
Key terms and concepts needed to comprehend L-H Transition include understanding plasma and fusion.

=== Plasma ===
Plasma is one of the four fundamental states of matter, other than solid, liquid, and gas. In contrast to other states, plasma is composed of ionized gas particles, which cause the separation of its electrons from atoms/molecules and result in the creation of an electrically conductive medium. It occurs in phenomena like lightning, stars, and fusion plasma.

=== Fusion ===
Fusion is a nuclear process in which two atomic nuclei combine to form a single bigger nucleus. This phenomenon releases a substantial amount of energy and is the process that powers stars. On Earth, controlled nuclear fusion is being pursued as a clean and virtually limitless energy source. It involves the fusion of isotopes like deuterium (hydrogen atom with 1 neutron) and tritium (hydrogen atom with 2 neutrons), and generates energy in the form of kinetic energy (energy in the form of motion/high speed) of released particles, such as neutrons, and intense heat. The principle is based on Einstein's equation E=mc^2, and as the resulting helium is marginally lighter than the two original hydrogens, the difference in the mass is converted into energy, known as mass defect. It is this energy that can be converted into clean electricity without producing waste.

== Overview of Confinement Modes ==
Plasma in both L-Mode and H-Mode exhibit distinct characteristics related to turbulence, control, power thresholds, energy efficiency, and confinement durations.

Trait	L-Mode	H-mode
Turbulence	High Turbulence, Low Stability	Low Turbulence, High Stability
Plasma Control Difficulty	Relatively easy	Relatively Hard, precise control required due to increased stability
Power Threshold (PLH)	Low Threshold	High threshold
Energy Efficiency	Less Efficient, Harder to sustain	More efficient, easier to attain
Confinement Time	Short, up to a few seconds	Longer, up to 30 seconds
Pedestal Formation	None	Exist with high gradient

== PLH (H-Mode Power Threshold) ==
=== PLH ===
PLH (H-mode power threshold) is an essential parameter in nuclear fusion. It represents the minimum power input required to trigger the transition from a low-confinement mode (L-Mode) to a high-confinement mode (H-Mode) in plasma confinement devices, such as tokamaks or stellarators. The PLH signifies the point at which the plasma attains the conditions necessary for enhanced energy confinement, reduced turbulence, and improved stability characteristic of H-Mode. Controlled nuclear fusion requires understanding and precise control of the PLH in order to facilitate the continuous generation of energy from the fusion process.

=== Factors Influencing PLH ===
==== Plasma Density and Magnetic Field Strength ====
H-Mode Power Threshold (PLH) in experimental nuclear-controlled fusion is highly dependent on both plasma confinement and magnetic field intensity. Higher plasma densities and stronger magnetic fields correlate positively with the elevated PLH.

$\tau=(n*V)/(2*B)$

- τ is the confinement time
- n is plasma density
- V is the volume of the plasma
- B is the magnetic field strength

Higher plasma densities result in increased particle collisions, enhancing the confinement of energy and increasing the plasma's stability. The greater the density, the higher the threshold of power (PLH) required to transition from L-Mode to H-Mode. The increased particle density allows for improved plasma confinement, which is vital for sustaining fusion reactions efficiently.

Similarly, stronger magnetic fields serve to contain and shape the plasma, mitigating its loss and preventing contact with the reactor's walls, which would ultimately lead to the reaction's failure. This magnetic confinement is essential for preventing energy losses and ensuring that the plasma reaches the conditions necessary for the L-Mode to H-Mode transition.

==== Heating Method ====
The heating methods used in fusion devices significantly impact the PLH. Various techniques, such as neutral beam injection (introduction high energy neutral particles to increase plasma temperature), radio frequency heating (uses radiofrequency waves to increase kinetic energy of particles), and magnetic confinement(uses magnetic fields to control extremely hot plasma), are employed to heat the plasma to the required temperatures for H-Mode. The choice of heating method and the effectiveness of energy transfer to the plasma are key factors in determining the PLH.

==== Plasma Fueling ====
Plasma fueling, which involves introducing additional fuel into the plasma, is another factor influencing the PLH. By injecting fuel, researchers can alter the plasma's density and temperature. An efficient and well-calibrated fueling system can elevate the plasma density, increasing the number of particles within the plasma, which is essential for enhancing confinement and stability. Additionally, effective fueling contributes to the rise in plasma temperature, a vital factor in achieving the conditions required for the L-Mode to H-Mode transition.

==== Edge Plasma Control ====
Edge plasma control is an important aspect of achieving and maintaining H-Mode in fusion devices. The edge plasma region, located at the outer boundary of the plasma confinement area, is susceptible to instabilities and turbulence.

The edge plasma is sensitive to disturbances because it's close to the magnetic confinement boundaries, where the plasma interacts with the walls of the containment vessel. These disturbances can lead to issues like uneven heat and particle movement or localized turbulence, which affect the transition to H-Mode.

To tackle this techniques such as magnetic shaping and advanced tools can control the edge plasma. The aim is to reduce these disturbances and make the edge plasma more stable. By regulating factors such as temperature, density, and impurities in the edge plasma, researchers can influence the PLH (H-Mode Power Threshold). Effective control of these factors ensures that the conditions for transitioning from L-Mode to H-Mode are met and maintained.

=== Methods for Measuring and Determining PLH ===
==== Electron Cyclotron Emissions (ECE) ====
Electron Cyclotron Emission (ECE) diagnostics, involve observing the radiation emitted by electrons as they undergo cyclotron motion (motion where a particle moves in a spiral path away from the center) in the magnetic field. This technique provides valuable insights into plasma parameters, including electron temperature and density. By analyzing the emitted radiation's spectral characteristics, researchers can precisely measure these properties, aiding in the determination of PLH.

==== Thomson Scattering ====
Thomson scattering employs laser beams to scatter off plasma electrons. The scattered light's characteristics show data on the velocity and temperature of these electrons, providing critical information about the plasma's thermal energy.

==== Magnetic Diagnostics ====
Magnetic sensors and probes are employed to map the magnetic fields within the plasma confinement device. Knowledge of the magnetic field's strength and configuration is fundamental for determining PLH, as it directly affects plasma stability and confinement.

==== Langmuir Probes ====
Langmuir probes are small electrodes inserted into the plasma to measure its properties, including electron temperature, density, and plasma potential. These measurements are critical for evaluating PLH and understanding the behavior of the plasma.

== Transition Mechanisms ==
A few key processes that make the transition between L-H transition possible and allow for the improved stability of H-mode are edge turbulence, E×B shear, edge electric field, edge current, and plasma flow.

=== Mechanisms Driving L-H Transition ===
==== Edge Turbulence ====
The behavior of edge turbulence, a common feature in plasmas, is closely linked to the L-H transition. Researchers study how turbulence responds to changes in parameters like E×B shear, Er gradients, and other variables.

==== E×B Shear ====
One of the mechanisms thought to be responsible for triggering the L-H transition is the phenomenon known as E×B shear stabilization of turbulence. This refers to the rotation of the plasma resulting from the interaction between the electric field (E) and the magnetic field (B). As the plasma approaches the transition point, the E×B shear increases, creating a shearing (moving in a way that opposes the turbulent transport of particles, heat, and energy) motion within the plasma. This shearing motion suppresses turbulent transport (turbulent structures, such as eddies and vortices, within the plasma), promoting stability and improved confinement characteristic of H-mode.

==== Edge Electric Field (Er) ====
The behavior of the plasma at its edge, specifically the edge electric field (Er), plays a role in the L-H transition. As the transition approaches, there is the emergence of increasingly steep Er gradients near the plasma's edge. These gradient changes are closely associated with the suppression of turbulent transport, which refers to the erratic movement of particles and heat within the plasma. This suppression marks the shift to the H-mode, a state of plasma confinement that is significantly more efficient and stable, making it a key goal in nuclear fusion research.

==== Edge Current and Plasma Flow ====
The L-H transition's characteristics are further influenced by edge current and the toroidal flow of plasma. The complex interactions between these two elements can introduce variability in the threshold conditions for the transition to the more efficient H-mode.

== Future Implications ==
L-H transition in nuclear fusion, if understood and used correctly, has the potential for clean energy and sustainable power plants.

=== Importance of Understanding L-H Transition in Nuclear Fusion ===
==== Enhanced Confinement ====
The transition to H-Mode brings about an improvement in plasma confinement. This leads to increased energy production and more efficient fusion reactions.

==== Pedestal Formation ====
H-Mode is associated with the development of a "pedestal" in the plasma profile. This pedestal acts as a protective barrier, preventing the plasma from contacting the reactor walls. The pedestal enhances stability and enables the plasma to reach the conditions necessary for sustained fusion reactions.

==== PLH Optimization ====
Achieving and maintaining H-Mode requires reaching the PLH (H-Mode Power Threshold). Understanding the factors that influence PLH, such as plasma density, magnetic field strength, heating methods, and edge plasma control, is essential for ensuring a smooth transition and sustained H-Mode operation.

==== Future Energy Solutions ====
Controlled nuclear fusion has the potential to revolutionize the energy sector. It offers a clean and virtually limitless energy source, significantly reducing greenhouse gas emissions and addressing energy demands. The L-H transition is a critical step towards harnessing the immense energy release of fusion reactions.
