= SHEILA (stellarator) =

Small Heliac Experimental Apparatus
- Device type: Stellarator
- Location: Canberra, Australia

Technical specifications
- Major radius: 0.19 m (7.5 in)
- Minor radius: 0.035 m (1.4 in)
- Magnetic field: 0.03–0.15 T (300–1,500 G)

History
- Year(s) of operation: 1984–1992
- Succeeded by: H-1NF

SHEILA, the Small Heliac Experimental Apparatus, was the first stellarator in heliac configuration to be built. The heliac is a particularly simple magnetic confinement fusion configuration with only circular magnetic coils and no induced plasma current. It was proposed in 1983 by Shoichi Yoshikawa at Princeton Plasma Physics Laboratory (PPPL). SHEILA was built and operated in 1984 at the ANU in Canberra, Australia.

Although small, SHEILA quickly demonstrated that the theoretical proposal of a heliac by PPPL was actually capable of confining plasma with flux surfaces, and was therefore a real prospect for fusion power. Flux surfaces were measured with a high resolution electron gun system, and successfully predicted by computations performed in collaboration with PPPL and Oak Ridge National Laboratory in the USA. In 1985, SHEILA was also modified to a flexible heliac, again the first such device.

SHEILA was followed at the same research centre by the larger and more capable H-1NF flexible heliac. In Spain, the TJ-II flexible helical was later built.
