= Edge-localized mode =

Plasma instability at the edge of tokamak fusion devices

An edge localized mode (ELM) is a type of plasma instability which manifests in the outermost region of a tokamak plasma operating in the high-confinement regime (H-mode). ELMs occur semi-periodically, driving intense bursts of plasma out of confinement and onto the plasma-facing components of the device.

ELMs are of concern for future tokamaks such as ITER and STEP, where much more plasma is confined, and at greater pressures, than in current devices like D-IIID, AUG, or MAST-U. For these future devices the transient heat loads on plasma-facing components from ELMs are predicted to be unacceptably large, driving research into ELM mitigation and suppression.

== Mechanism ==
H-mode operation is characterized by the formation of a transport barrier very close to the edge of the plasma. In this region, turbulence-driven transport is suppressed. This allows for a very steep pressure gradient to form. As the plasma is further fueled and heated, a steep pressure gradient forms at the transport barrier. This localized pressure gradient is known as the pedestal.

As fueling and heating continue, the pressure in the core of the plasma increases while the pressure at the edge remains relatively constant. This creates a steadily increasing pressure gradient between the core and the edge of the plasma. Eventually, this pressure gradient reaches a threshold where the pedestal becomes unstable and a plasma instability grows (specifically a coupled peeling-ballooning mode). This instability ejects a portion of the plasma out of confinement. This is an ELM. Since plasma is ejected from confinement, the pressure gradient is reduced back to a stable level. This results in a quasi-periodic cycle of pedestal growth and collapse, which is known as the ELM cycle.

== Management and Control ==
=== Diverted tokamak ===
A tokamak featuring a divertor is known as a divertor tokamak or divertor configuration tokamak. In this configuration, the particles escape through a magnetic "gap" (separatrix), which allows the energy absorbing part of the divertor to be placed outside the plasma. The divertor configuration also makes it easier to obtain a more stable H-mode of operation. The plasma facing material in the divertor faces significantly different stresses compared to the majority of the first wall.

=== Small-ELM and ELM-free regimes ===
In an H-mode plasma, ELMs act as the primary exhaust mechanism. Without them, helium "ash" would accumulate in the core of the plasma. By using a different exhaust mechanism in the plasma to control the flow of heat and particles over the transport barrier and out of confinement, ELMs may be mitigated, or suppressed entirely.

== See also ==
- Resonant magnetic perturbations, a technique for producing ELM-free discharges.
