= Mako Yoshikawa =

American novelist

- Born: 1966 (age 59–60)
- Education: University of Michigan
- Occupation: Novelist

Mako Yoshikawa (born 1966) is an American novelist. She is the author of two novels, One Hundred and One Ways (1999), a national bestseller that was also translated into six languages, and Once Removed (2003).

Her recent work includes personal essays that have won awards and appeared in important literary journals and anthologies including: The Missouri Review, Southern Indiana Review, Harvard Review, and Best American Essays 2013. Eds. Cheryl Strayed and Robert Atwan.

Yoshikawa grew up in Princeton, New Jersey but spent two years of her childhood in Tokyo, Japan. She received a BA in English literature from Columbia University, a Masters in Shakespeare and Renaissance Drama at Lincoln College, Oxford, and a Ph.D. in English literature from the University of Michigan, Ann Arbor. She is the recipient of the Vera M. Schuyler Fellowship at The Bunting Institute of Harvard University.

She has also published scholarly essays on race and incest in American literature.

She lives in the Boston area and is a professor of creative writing at Emerson College.

She is the daughter of fusion physicist Shoichi Yoshikawa, and wrote a book about his life and work, Secrets of the Sun.
