= Divertor =

Magnetic confinement fusion device component

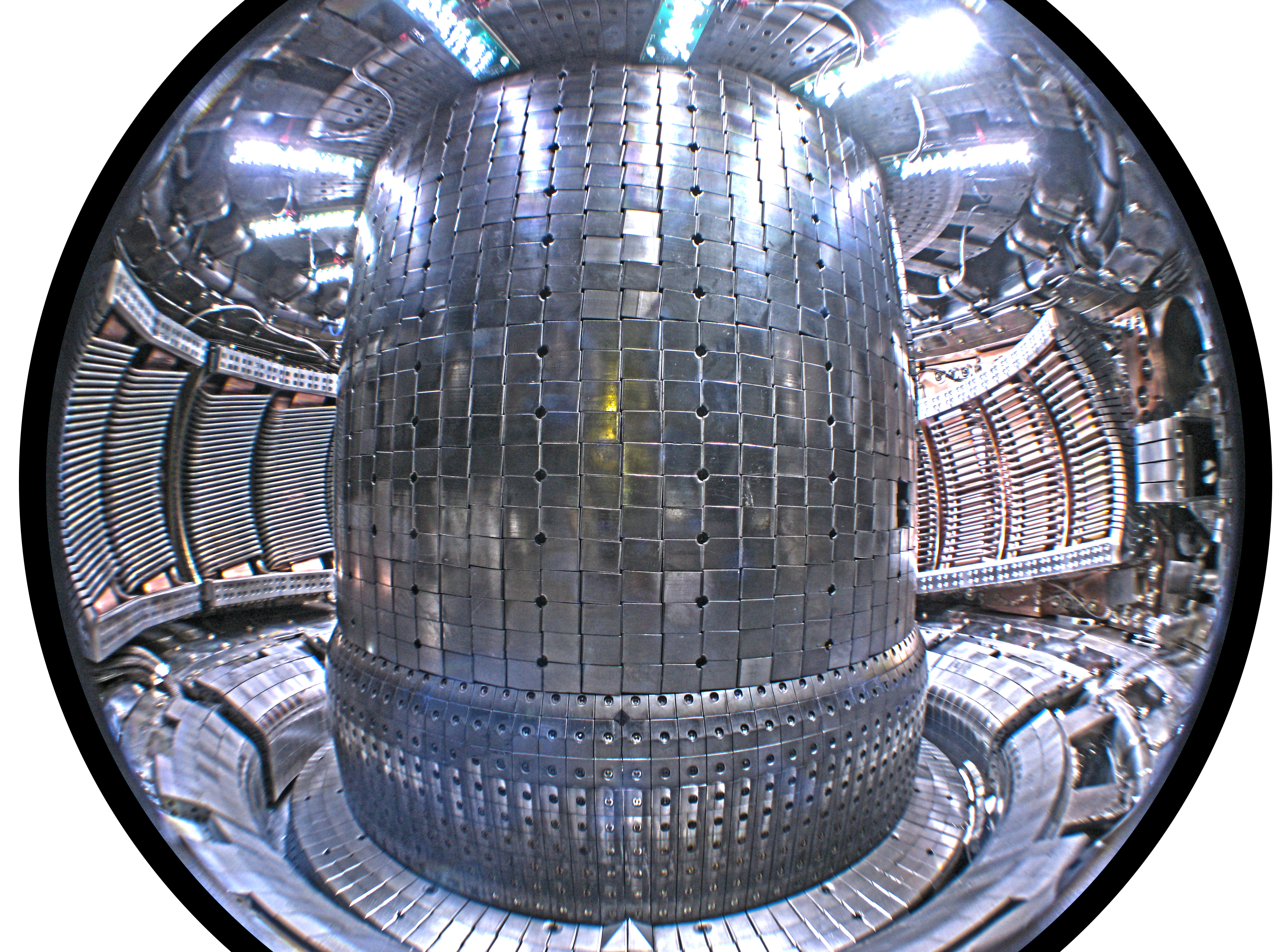
Interior of Alcator C-Mod showing the lower divertor channel at the bottom of the torus

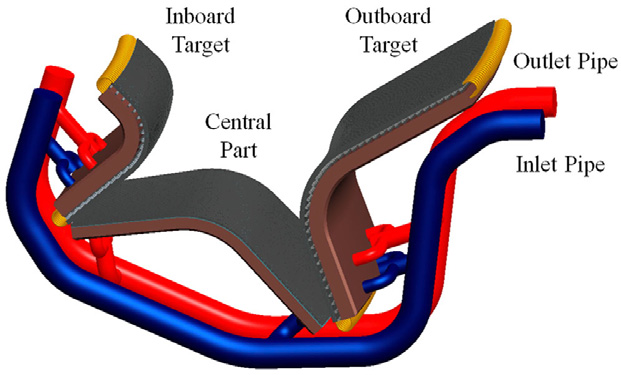
Divertor design for K-DEMO, a planned future tokamak experiment

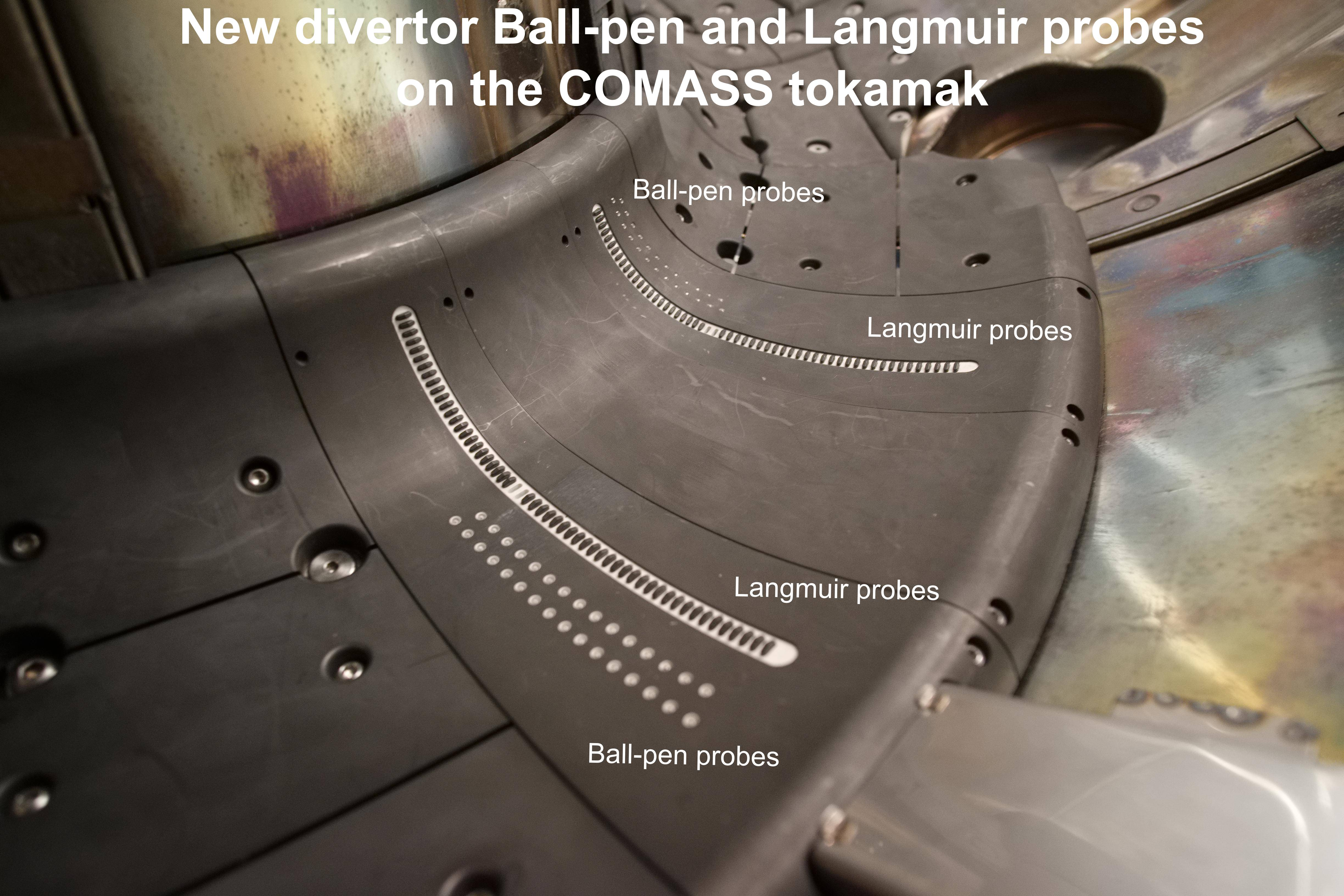
Divertor of COMPASS

In magnetic confinement fusion, a divertor is a device which extracts heat and ash from fusion plasmas by averting direct contact between the confined plasma and the main chamber wall (plasma-wall interactions). A magnetic divertor typically involves creating a separatrix-bounded magnetic topology using special magnetic coils. Particles and heat diffusing outward from the main plasma are diverted and follow the 'open' magnetic field lines to strike dedicated plasma-facing components.

The magnetic divertor concept was first proposed by Lyman Spitzer in 1951 aiming to reduce the impurity levels in stellarators due to sputtering from main chamber walls. It is now recognized as an essential component for heat and particle exhaust in fusion plasmas, with majority of modern day fusion devices capable of establishing a diverted configuration. In tokamaks, high confinement mode plasmas are more readily achieved in diverted configurations.

Divertor physics and optimizing its design as a plasma-wall interface for a power plant is a major research topic in fusion energy.

== History ==
The concept of a magnetic divertor was described by Lyman Spitzer in 1951. Initially envisioned for stellarators, the idea is to add special magnetic coils that create a magnetic separatrix to separate regions of "closed" and "open" field lines. Plasma particles and heat diffusing into the open field lines are transported rapidly along the magnetic field to material surfaces far form the confined core.

The divertor is now seen as an essential component of magnetic confinement devices. ITER's divertor will consist of a standard "single-null" magnetic divertor configuration and tungsten-armored plasma-facing components.

== Tokamak divertors ==
A tokamak featuring a divertor is known as a divertor tokamak or divertor configuration tokamak. In this configuration, the particles escape through a magnetic "gap" (separatrix), which allows the energy absorbing part of the divertor to be placed outside the plasma. The divertor configuration also makes it easier to obtain a more stable H-mode of operation. The plasma facing material in the divertor faces significantly different stresses compared to the majority of the first wall.

== Stellarator divertors ==
In stellarators, low-order magnetic islands can be used to form a divertor volume, the island divertor, for managing power and particle exhaust. The island divertor has shown success in accessing and stabilizing detached scenarios and has demonstrated reliable heat flux and detachment control with hydrogen gas injection, and impurity seeding in the W7-X stellarator. The magnetic island chain in the plasma edge can control plasma fueling. Despite some challenges, the island divertor concept has demonstrated great potential for managing power and particle exhaust in fusion reactors, and further research could lead to more efficient and reliable operation in the future.

The helical divertor, as employed in the Large Helical Device (LHD), utilizes large helical coils to create a diverting field. This design permits adjustment of the stochastic layer size, situated between the confined plasma volume and the field lines ending on the divertor plate. However, the compatibility of the Helical Divertor with stellarators optimized for neoclassical transport remains uncertain.

The non-resonant divertor provides an alternative design for optimized stellarators with significant bootstrap currents. This approach leverages sharp "ridges" on the plasma boundary to channel flux. The bootstrap currents modify the shape, not the location, of these ridges, providing an effective channeling mechanism. This design, although promising, has not been experimentally tested yet.

Given the complexity of the design of stellarator divertors, compared to their two-dimensional tokamak counterparts, a thorough understanding of their performance is crucial in stellarator optimization. The experiments with divertors in the W7-X and LHD have shown promising results and provide valuable insights for future improvements in shape and performance. Furthermore, the advent of non-resonant divertors offers an exciting path forward for quasi-symmetric stellarators and other configurations not optimized for minimizing plasma currents.

== See also ==
- Nuclear fusion
- ITER
