= NanoIntegris =

NanoIntegris Technologies, Inc.
- Type: Private
- Industry: Nanotechnology
- Founded: January 2007
- Headquarters: Boisbriand, Quebec
- Website: www.nanointegris.com

NanoIntegris is a nanotechnology company based in Boisbriand, Quebec specializing in the production of enriched, single-walled carbon nanotubes. In 2012, NanoIntegris was acquired by Raymor Industries, a large-scale producer of single-wall carbon nanotubes using the plasma torch process.

The proprietary technology through which NanoIntegris creates its products spun out of the Hersam Research Group at Northwestern University.

== Process ==
The process through which these technologies emerged is called density gradient ultracentrifugation (DGU). DGU has been used for some time in biological and medical applications but Dr. Mark Hersam utilized this process with carbon nanotubes which allowed for those nanotubes with semi-conductive properties to be separated from those with conductive properties. While the DGU method was the first one to convincingly produce high-purity semiconducting carbon nanotubes, the rotation speeds involved limit the amount of liquid, and thus nanotubes, that can be processed with this technology. NanoIntegris has recently licensed a new process using selective wrapping of semiconducting nanotubes with conjugated polymers. This method is scalable thus enabling the supply of this material in large quantities for commercial applications.

== Products ==
=== Semiconducting SWCNT ===
Enriched Semiconducting carbon nanotubes (sc-SWCNT) using either a density-gradient ultracentrifugation (DGU) or a polymer-wrapping (conjugated polymer extraction(CPE)) method. While the DGU method is used to disperse and enrich sc-SWCNT in an aqueous solution, the CPE method disperses and enriches sc-SWCNT in non-polar aromatic solvents

=== Conducting SWCNT ===
Enriched Conducting carbon nanotubes

=== PlasmaTubes SWCNT ===
Highly graphitized single-wall carbon nanotubes grown using an industrial-scale plasma torch. Nanotubes are grown using a plasma torch display diameters, lengths, and purity levels comparable to the arc and laser methods. The nanotubes measure between 1 and 1.5 nm in diameter and between 0.3-5 microns in length.

=== Pure and SuperPureTubes SWCNT ===
Highly purified carbon nanotubes. Carbon impurities and metal catalysts impurities below 3% and 1.5% respectively.

=== PureSheets/Graphene ===
1-4+ layer graphene sheets obtained by liquid exfoliation of graphite

=== HiPco SWCNT ===
Small-diameter single-walled carbon nanotubes

== Applications ==
Field-Effect Transistors

Both Wang and Engel have found that NanoIntegris separated nanotubes "hold great potential for thin-film transistors and display applications" compared to standard carbon nanotubes. More recently, nanotube-based thin film transistors have been printed using inkjet or gravure methods on a variety of flexible substrates including polyimide and polyethylene (PET) and transparent substrates such as glass. These p-type thin film transistors reliably exhibit high-mobilities (> 10 cm^2/V/s) and ON/OFF ratios (> 10^3) and threshold voltages below 5 V. Nanotube-enabled thin-film transistors thus offer high mobility and current density, low power consumption as well as environmental stability and especially mechanical flexibility. Hysterisis in the current-voltage curves as well as variability in the threshold voltage are issues that remain to be solved on the way to nanotube-enabled OTFT backplanes for flexible displays.

Transparent Conductors

Additionally, the ability to distinguish semiconducting from conducting nanotubes was found to have an effect on conductive films.

Organic Light-Emitting Diodes

Organic Light-Emitting Diodes (OLEDs) can be made on a larger scale and at a lower cost using separated carbon nanotubes.

High Frequency Devices

By using high-purity, semiconducting nanotubes, scientists have been able to achieve "record...operating frequencies above 80 GHz."
