= Plasma surface interaction =

In plasma physics and controlled nuclear fusion, plasma-surface interactions concern the physical, chemical, and mechanical processes at the interface between plasma and solid surfaces.

A critical area of ongoing research in magnetic confinement fusion devices, such as tokamaks and stellarators, is understanding the physics of the plasma boundary and its interactions with plasma-facing components (PFCs), typically in the form of divertors or limiters. The high energy and particle fluxes from the plasma can alter surface properties such as composition, structure, roughness, and temperature, which in turn influence plasma behavior.

For a fusion reactor to be viable, it must have a robust boundary solution that addresses several key challenges simultaneously: managing power exhaust to keep wall heat loads within material limits, ensuring efficient removal of fusion ash by maintaining sufficient neutral pressure for pumping, minimizing the sputtering of high-Z impurities (e.g. tungsten), and reducing fuel retention by limiting tritium trapping in wall materials—all while sustaining high plasma performance for optimal energy gain.

== Topics ==
=== Plasma-material interaction processes ===
Plasma-material interactions encompass a variety of complex processes, including sputtering, ion implantation, radiation damage, erosion, deposition, and material re-deposition.

=== Wall conditioning ===
Wall conditioning in magnetic confinement fusion and devices serves to manage impurities and control the fuel gas from PFCs. Currently, glow discharge boronization (GDB) is a prevalent technique, using boron-rich gases to deposit boron coatings on device walls, thereby enhancing performance. Nonetheless, for long-pulse, next-step fusion devices, alternative strategies are being explored due to the limitations of GDB.
