= Rajesh Maingi =

American physicist

Rajesh Maingi is a physicist known for his expertise in the physics of plasma edges and program leadership in the field of fusion energy. He is currently the head of Tokamak Experimental Sciences at the U.S. Department of Energy's (DOE) Princeton Plasma Physics Laboratory (PPPL). He is a Fellow of both the American Physical Society and the American Nuclear Society and has chaired or co-chaired numerous national and international conferences.

== Early Life ==
Maingi was born in New Delhi, India to Surender and Prem Maingi on 19 December, 1964. His parents moved to Raleigh, North Carolina in 1971 when he was 6 years old.

== Life ==
Maingi joined PPPL in 2012 after serving on a long-term assignment from Oak Ridge National Laboratory to the National Spherical Torus Experiment (NSTX) at PPPL from 1999 to 2012. During this time, he became a recognized expert in understanding the behavior of fusion plasma edges and their interactions with tokamak walls. His research includes studying the effects of plasma interactions with lithium, which has been shown to improve a tokamak's performance and prolong fusion reactions.

As head of Tokamak Experimental Sciences (TES) at PPPL, Maingi oversees a restructured organization that brings together all PPPL departments and divisions developing tokamak science. The reorganization aims to enhance PPPL's role as the U.S. national laboratory devoted to fusion energy science and to prepare for ITER research, operations, and participation in tokamak fusion pilot plant design activities. Units under TES include the National Spherical Torus Experiment-Upgrade (NSTX-U), the Lithium Tokamak Experiment-Beta (LTX-β), Public and Private Tokamak Collaborations, the DIII-D National Fusion Facility, ITER Research and Operations Coordination, and the TRANSP project.
