= Alexander Bradshaw =

British physicist (1944–2024)

Alexander Bradshaw CBE FRS HonFInstP
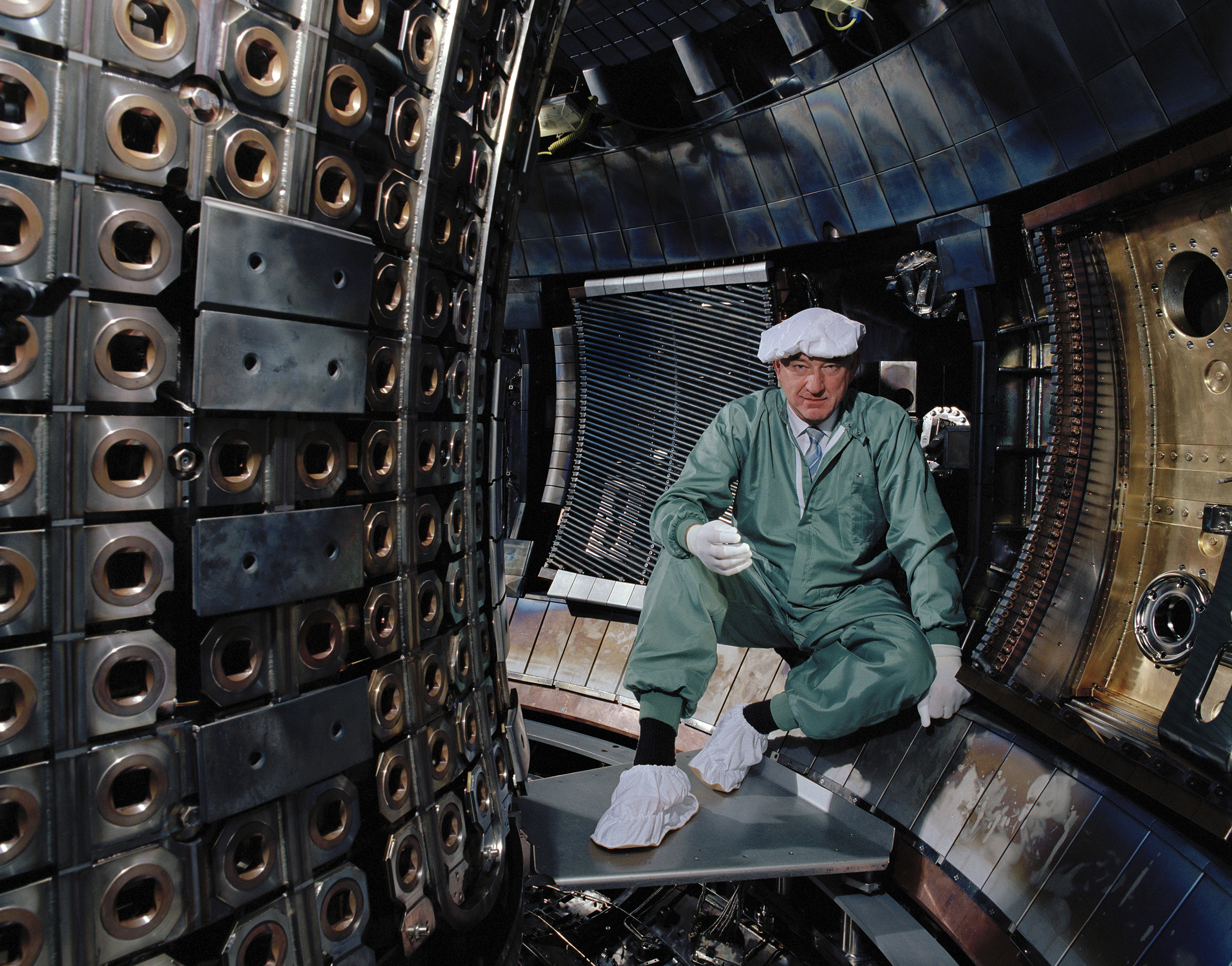
- Bradshaw photographed by Oliver Mark in the ASDEX Upgrade, 2006
- Born: 12 June 1944; Bushey, Hertfordshire, England
- Died: 10 October 2024 (aged 80); Berlin, Germany
- Education: University of London; Technical University of Munich
- Awards: Federal Cross of Merit (Germany)
- Scientific career
- Fields: Physics
- Workplaces: Fritz Haber Institute of the Max Planck Society; Max Planck Institute for Plasma Physics
- Website: Max-Planck Institute

Alexander Marian Bradshaw CBE, FRS, HonFInstP (12 July 1944 – 10 October 2024) was a British physicist. Between 1980 and 1998 he was scientific director of the Fritz Haber Institute of the Max Planck Society and, during the 1980s, BESSY. He was the scientific director of the Max Planck Institute for Plasma Physics, from 1999 to 2008.

Bradshaw earned a PhD from University of London in 1969, and habilitation from the Technical University of Munich in 1974. He is also notable for his work with D. Phil Woodruff, on photoelectron diffraction.

He was a Fellow of the Royal Society, and a member of the German National Academy of Sciences Leopoldina and the Academia Europaea.

Bradshaw died in Berlin on 10 October 2024, at the age of 80.
