= Plasma-facing material =

Nuclear reactor vessel lining

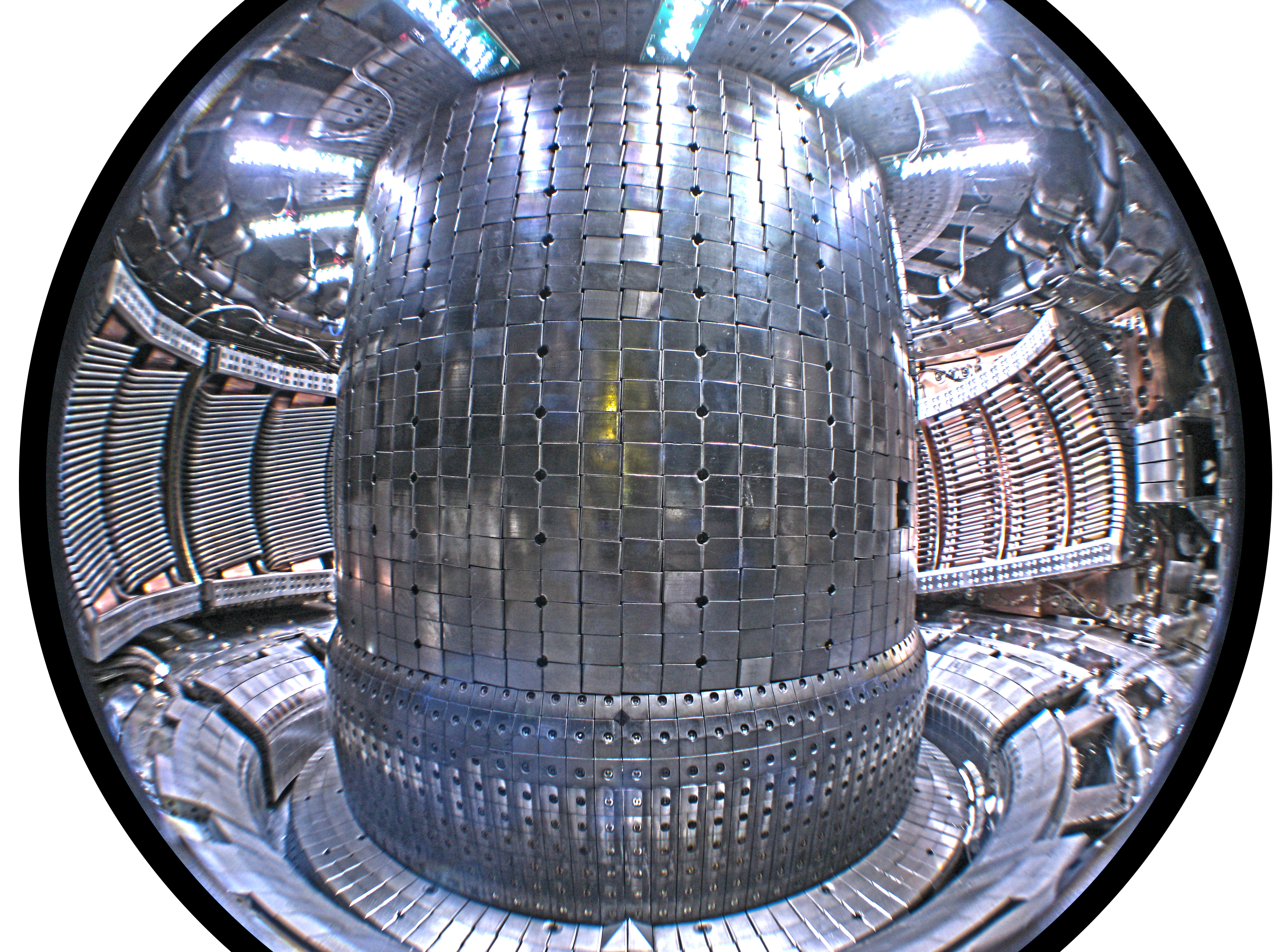
Interior of Alcator C-Mod showing the molybdenum tiles used as first wall material

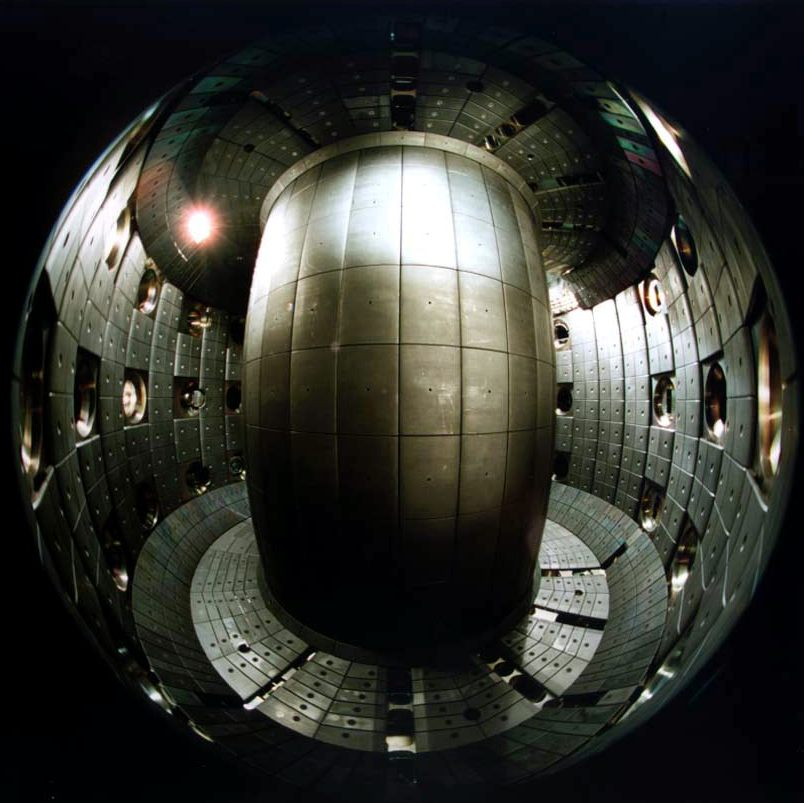
Interior of Tokamak à configuration variable showing the graphite tiles used as first wall material

In nuclear fusion power research, the plasma-facing material (or materials) is any material used to construct the plasma-facing components (PFC) those components exposed to the plasma within which nuclear fusion occurs, and particularly the material used for the lining the first wall or divertor region of the reactor vessel.

Plasma-facing materials for fusion reactor designs must support the overall steps for energy generation, these include:

1. Generating heat through fusion,
2. Capturing heat in the first wall,
3. Transferring heat at a faster rate than capturing heat.
4. Generating electricity.

In addition plasma-facing materials have to operate over the lifetime of a fusion reactor vessel by handling the harsh environmental conditions, such as:

1. Ion bombardment causing physical and chemical sputtering and therefore erosion.
2. Ion implantation causing displacement damage and chemical composition changes
3. High-heat fluxes (e.g. 10 MW/m$^2$) due to ELMs and other transients.
4. Limited tritium codeposition and sequestration.
5. Stable thermomechanical properties under operation.
6. Limited number of negative nuclear transmutation effects

Currently, fusion reactor research focuses on improving efficiency and reliability in heat generation and capture and on raising the rate of transfer. Generating electricity from heat is beyond the scope of current research, due to existing efficient heat-transfer cycles, such as heating water to operate steam turbines that drive electrical generators.

Current reactor designs are fueled by deuterium-tritium (D-T) fusion reactions, which produce high-energy neutrons that can damage the first wall, however, high-energy neutrons (14.1 MeV) are needed for blanket and Tritium breeder operation. Tritium is not a naturally abundant isotope due to its short half-life, therefore for a fusion D-T reactor it will need to be bred by the nuclear reaction of lithium (Li), boron (B), or beryllium (Be) isotopes with high-energy neutrons that collide within the first wall.

== Requirements ==
Most magnetic confinement fusion devices (MCFD) consist of several key components in their technical designs, including:

- Magnet system: confines the deuterium-tritium fuel in the form of plasma and in the shape of a torus.
- Vacuum vessel: contains the core fusion plasma and maintains fusion conditions.
- First wall: positioned between the plasma and magnets in order to protect outer vessel components from radiation damage.
- Cooling system: removes heat from the confinement and transfers heat from the first wall.

The core fusion plasma must not actually touch the first wall. ITER and many other current and projected fusion experiments, particularly those of the tokamak and stellarator designs, use intense magnetic fields in an attempt to achieve this, although plasma instability problems remain. Even with stable plasma confinement, however, the first wall material would be exposed to a neutron flux higher than in any current nuclear power reactor, which leads to two key problems in selecting the material:

- It must withstand this neutron flux for a sufficient period of time to be economically viable.
- It must not become sufficiently radioactive so as to produce unacceptable amounts of nuclear waste when lining replacement or plant decommissioning eventually occurs.

The lining material must also:

- Allow the passage of a large heat flux.
- Be compatible with intense and fluctuating magnetic fields.
- Minimize contamination of the plasma.
- Retain minimal amounts of plasma fuel species (mainly tritium)
- Be produced and replaced at a reasonable cost.

Some critical plasma-facing components, such as and in particular the divertor, are typically protected by a different material than that used for the major area of the first wall.

== Proposed materials ==
Materials currently in use or under consideration include:

- Tungsten
- Molybdenum
- Beryllium
- Lithium
- Tin
- Boron carbide
- Silicon carbide
- Carbon fibre composite (CFC)
- Graphite

Multi-layer tiles of several of these materials are also being considered and used, for example:

- A thin molybdenum layer on graphite tiles.
- A thin tungsten layer on graphite tiles.
- A tungsten layer on top of a molybdenum layer on graphite tiles.
- A boron carbide layer on top of CFC tiles.
- A liquid lithium layer on graphite tiles.
- A liquid lithium layer on top of a boron layer on graphite tiles.
- A liquid lithium layer on tungsten-based solid plasma-facing component surfaces or divertors.

Graphite was used for the first wall material of the Joint European Torus (JET) at its startup (1983), in Tokamak à configuration variable (1992) and in National Spherical Torus Experiment (NSTX, first plasma 1999).

Beryllium was used to reline JET in 2009 in anticipation of its proposed use in ITER.

Tungsten is used for the divertor in JET, and will be used for the divertor in ITER. It is also used for the first wall in ASDEX Upgrade. Graphite tiles plasma sprayed with tungsten were used for the ASDEX Upgrade divertor. Studies of tungsten in the divertor have been conducted at the DIII-D facility. These experiments utilized two rings of tungsten isotopes embedded in the lower divertor to characterize erosion tungsten during operation. Molybdenum is used for the first wall material in Alcator C-Mod (1991).

Liquid lithium was used to coat the plasma-facing component of the Tokamak Fusion Test Reactor in the Lithium Tokamak Experiment (TFTR, 1996) and is currently used in Princeton Plasma Physics Laboratory's (PPPL) Lithium Tokamak Experiment-𝛽 (LTX-𝛽).

== Considerations ==
Development of satisfactory plasma-facing materials is one of the key problems still to be solved by current programs.

Plasma-facing materials can be measured for performance in terms of:

- Power production for a given reactor size.
- Cost to generate electricity.
- Self-sufficiency of tritium production.
- Availability of materials.
- Design and fabrication of the plasma-facing components.
- Safety in waste disposal and in maintenance.

The International Fusion Materials Irradiation Facility will particularly address this. Materials developed using this facility will be used in DEMOnstration Power Station, the proposed successor to ITER.

French Nobel laureate in physics Pierre-Gilles de Gennes said of nuclear fusion, "We say that we will put the sun into a box. The idea is pretty. The problem is, we don't know how to make the box."

== Recent developments ==
Solid plasma-facing materials are known to be susceptible to damage under large heat loads and high neutron flux. If damaged, these solids can contaminate the plasma and decrease plasma confinement stability. In addition, radiation can leak through defects in the solids and contaminate outer vessel components.

Graphite is being phased out as a plasma-facing wall material because it undergoes strong chemical sputtering in hydrogen plasmas, leading to high erosion, tritium co-deposition and retention, dust formation, and impurity influx, while also suffering from neutron-induced degradation and limited lifetime under reactor heat loads; for example, measurements in the W7-X graphite divertor showed net erosion of up to 20 μm at the strike line and a total of 48 ± 14 g of carbon removed over 3776 s of plasma exposure, corresponding to effective erosion rates of ~5–8 nm s⁻¹.

Liquid metal plasma-facing components that enclose the plasma have been proposed to address challenges in the plasma-facing components. In particular, liquid lithium has been confirmed to have various properties that are attractive for fusion reactor performance. In 2026, researchers from PPPL, Princeton University and Pennsylvania State University demonstrated one effective approach to clearing a roadblock for using liquid lithium to protect the inner surfaces of fusion systems: scrubbing porous tungsten samples inside the LTX-𝛽 by heating the tiles and bombarding them with particles from a neon plasma to knock contaminants out of tiles. The approach could be used after the tiles have been sealed inside a vacuum vessel.

== Tungsten ==
Tungsten is widely recognized as the preferred material for plasma-facing components in next-generation fusion devices, largely due to its unique combination of properties and potential for enhancement. Its low erosion rates make it particularly suitable for the high-stress environment of fusion reactors, where it can withstand the intense conditions without degrading rapidly. Additionally, tungsten's low tritium retention through co-deposition and implantation is crucial in fusion contexts, helping to minimize the accumulation of this radioactive isotope.

Another key advantage of tungsten is its high thermal conductivity, essential for managing the extreme heat generated in fusion processes. This property ensures efficient heat dissipation, reducing the risk of damage to the reactor's internal components. Furthermore, the potential for developing radiation-hardened alloys of tungsten presents an opportunity to enhance its durability and performance under the intense radiation conditions typical in fusion reactors.

Despite these benefits, tungsten is not without its drawbacks. One notable issue is its tendency to contribute to high core radiation, a significant challenge in maintaining the plasma performance in fusion reactors. Another notable drawback of tungsten is the formation of tendril-like structures, also known as 'tungsten fuzz' by the plasma-facing materials community, on the plasma-facing surface, particularly under helium-ion irradiation at reactor-relevant temperatures. This phenomenon results from helium bubble formation and migration, which is common in tokamak environments because energetic helium particles are a byproduct of the DT fusion reaction. The formation of tungsten fuzz reduces the PFC's thermal conductivity and could further contaminate the plasma if tendrils detach from the surface. Nevertheless, tungsten has been selected as the plasma-facing material for the ITER project's first-generation divertor, and it is likely to be used for the reactor's first wall as well.

Another drawback of the use of tungsten as plasma-facing material is that it is not very effective in removing, or gettering, impurities, such as oxygen and water, from the vacuum environment as opposed to for example beryllium. The presence of impurities in the vessel can lead to significant radiation losses in the core plasma and has also led to disruptions of the plasma. For this reason, a method known as boronization has been employed in several fusion devices with tungsten plasma-facing components and is planned to be used for ITER as well. A consequence of boronization of the tungsten plasma-facing components will be the formation of tungsten-boron (W-B) mixtures, the properties of which may be very different from those of tungsten by itself. Of special concern is the change in fuel retention properties of the W-B mixtures that form.

Understanding the behavior of tungsten in fusion environments, including its sourcing, migration, and transport in the scrape-off-layer (SOL), as well as its potential for core contamination, is a complex task. Significant research is ongoing to develop a mature and validated understanding of these dynamics, particularly for predicting the behavior of high-Z (high atomic number) materials like tungsten in next-step tokamak devices.

To address tungsten's intrinsic brittleness, which limits its operational window, a composite material known as W-fibre enhanced W-composite (Wf/W) has been developed. This material incorporates extrinsic toughening mechanisms to significantly increase toughness, as demonstrated in small Wf/W samples.

In the context of future fusion power plants, tungsten stands out for its resilience against erosion, the highest melting point among metals, and relatively benign behavior under neutron irradiation. However, its ductile to brittle transition temperature (DBTT) is a concern, especially as it increases under neutron exposure. To overcome this brittleness, several strategies are being explored, including the use of nanocrystalline materials, tungsten alloying, and W-composite materials.

Particularly notable are the tungsten laminates and fiber-reinforced composites, which leverage tungsten's exceptional mechanical properties. When combined with copper's high thermal conductivity, these composites offer improved thermomechanical properties, extending beyond the operational range of traditional materials like CuCrZr. For applications requiring even higher temperature resilience, tungsten-fibre reinforced tungsten-composites (Wf/W) have been developed, incorporating mechanisms to enhance toughness, thereby broadening the potential applications of tungsten in fusion technology.

== Lithium ==
Lithium (Li) is an alkali metal with a low Z (atomic number). Li has a low first ionization energy of ~5.4 eV and is highly chemically reactive with ion species found in the plasma of fusion reactor cores. In particular, Li readily forms stable lithium compounds with hydrogen isotopes, oxygen, carbon, and other impurities found in D-T plasma.

The fusion reaction of D-T produces charged and neutral particles in the plasma. The charged particles remain magnetically confined to the plasma. The neutral particles are not magnetically confined and will move toward the boundary between the hotter plasma and the colder plasma-facing components. Upon reaching the first wall, both neutral particles and charged particles that escaped the plasma become cold neutral particles in gaseous form. An outer edge of cold neutral gas is then "recycled", or mixed, with the hotter plasma. A temperature gradient between the cold neutral gas and the hot plasma is believed to be the principal cause of anomalous electron and ion transport from the magnetically confined plasma. As recycling decreases, the temperature gradient decreases and plasma confinement stability increases. With better conditions for fusion in the plasma, the reactor performance increases.

Initial use of lithium in the 1990s was motivated by a need for a low-recycling plasma-facing component. In 1996, ~ 0.02 grams of lithium coating was added to the PFC of TFTR, resulting in the fusion power output and the fusion plasma confinement to improve by a factor of two. On the first wall, lithium reacted with neutral particles to produce stable lithium compounds, resulting in low-recycling of cold neutral gas. In addition, lithium contamination in the plasma tended to be well below 1%.

Since 1996, these results have been confirmed by a large number of magnetic confinement fusion devices (MCFD) that have also used lithium in their plasma-facing components, for example:

- TFTR (US), CDX-U (2005)/LTX(2010) (US), CPD (Japan), HT-7 (China), EAST (China), FTU (Italy).
- NSTX (US), T-10 (Russia), T-11M (Russia), TJ-II (Spain), RFX (Italy).

Recent experiments on the DIII-D tokamak have compared pre-lithiated samples with lithium–deuterium co-deposits formed during in-situ lithium powder injection into H-mode deuterium plasmas. At temperatures below the melting point of lithium, deuterium retention in solid lithium films exposed to the far scrape-off layer was found to be largely independent of the pre-deposited film thickness and instead dominated by Li–D co-deposits; erosion of both pre-deposited and in-situ deposited lithium was also lower than predicted by sputtering-yield calculations.

Experiments in PPPL's LTX-β demonstrated that the liquid lithium improves the performance of the plasma by creating a low recycling environment for hydrogen that keeps the very edge of the plasma hot, making the plasma more stable and providing room for a larger volume of plasma. Researchers speculate that this could lead to smaller, less costly tokamak fusion systems.

The primary energy generation in fusion reactor designs is from the absorption of high-energy neutrons. Results from these MCFD highlight additional benefits of liquid lithium coatings for reliable energy generation, including:

1. Absorb high-energy, or fast-moving, neutrons. About 80% of the energy produced in a fusion reaction of D-T is in the kinetic energy of the newly produced neutron.
2. Convert kinetic energies of absorbed neutrons into heat on the first wall. The heat that is produced on the first wall can then be removed by coolants in ancillary systems that generate electricity.
3. Self-sufficient breeding of tritium by nuclear reaction with absorbed neutrons. Neutrons of varying kinetic energies will drive tritium-breeding reactions.

== Liquid lithium ==
Newer developments in liquid lithium are currently being tested, for example:

- Coatings made of increasingly complex liquid lithium compounds.
- Multi-layered coatings of liquid lithium, B, F, and other low-Z metals.
- Higher density coatings of liquid lithium for use on plasma-facing components designed for greater heat loads and neutron flux.
- Flowing liquid lithium up and down a series of slats in tiles lining the bottom of the vessel to protect the components that face the neutron bombardment.

== Silicon carbide ==
Silicon carbide (SiC), a low-Z refractory ceramic material, has emerged as a promising candidate for structural materials in magnetic fusion energy devices. While the remarkable properties of SiC once attracted attention for fusion experiments, past technological limitations hindered its wider use. However, the evolving capabilities of SiC fiber composites (SiCf/SiC) in Gen-IV fission reactors have renewed interest in SiC as a fusion material.

Modern versions of SiCf/SiC combine many desirable attributes found in carbon fiber composites, such as thermo-mechanical strength and high melting point. These versions also present unique benefits: they exhibit minimal degradation of properties when exposed to high levels of neutron damage. SiC has demonstrated a tritium diffusivity lower than that observed in other structural materials, a property that can be further optimized by applying a thin layer of monolithic SiC on a SiC/SiCf substrate. However, high helium production in SiC during neutron irradiation leads to swelling, particularly at intermediate and high temperatures (>1000°C), which may impact its structural integrity. Additionally, SiC's most common fabrication method, chemical vapor infiltration (CVI), results in approximately 10% porosity, making it permeable to gases and reducing both its thermal conductivity and mechanical stress limit. Tritium retention in silicon carbide plasma-facing components is about 1.5-2 times higher than in graphite, leading to reduced fuel efficiency and increased safety risks in fusion reactors. SiC traps more tritium, limiting its availability for fusion and increasing the potential for hazardous buildup, which complicates tritium management. Displacement damage, particle deposition, redeposition, and fuel accumulation on the SiC divertor surface lead to significant microstructural changes, resulting in enhanced sputtering erosion compared to the original crystalline material. The chemical and physical sputtering of SiC is still significant and contributes to the key issue of increasing tritium inventory through co-deposition over time and with particle fluency. For those reasons, carbon-based materials have been ruled out in ITER, DEMO, and other devices.

Siliconization, as a wall conditioning method, has been demonstrated to reduce oxygen impurities and enhance plasma performance. Current research efforts focus on understanding SiC behavior under conditions relevant to reactors, providing valuable insights into its potential role in future fusion technology. Silicon-rich films on divertor plasma-facing components were recently developed using Si pellet injections in high confinement mode scenarios in DIII-D, prompting further research into refining the technique for broader fusion applications.

== Ultra-High Temperature Ceramics ==
In addition to SiC, ultra-high temperature ceramics (UHTCs) as a whole have begun to gather interest due to their extreme melting points, and unirradiated properties. While there are a wide range of ceramic types, each have their own advantages and disadvantages. For example, carbides have the highest melting temperature, while diborides have the highest thermal conductivities at higher temperatures. In comparison to W and Be, UHTCs have had little investigation and as a result the effects of irradiation are not well understood, with many of the current studies focusing on single component ceramics (ex. ZrC, ThO_{2}, and ZrB_{2}). In addition, multicomponent UHTCs, such as bi- and tri-carbides as well as high entropy ceramics are particularly attractive due to their potential for tailorable thermal and mechanical properties. Although, some work has been conducted on the degradation of thermal conductivity.

Thermal conductivity in most ceramics is heavily dependent on phonon transport, unlike most metals which depend on electron transport. This phonon transport is significantly hindered by neutron irradiation due to defects and nuclear transmutation. However, UHTCs contain ionic, covalent, and metallic bonding, which more evenly distributes the contribution of both types of transport. Thus, it is suggested that these materials will exhibit a smaller reduction in thermal conductivity, which has been observed in some UHTCs, such as ZrB_{2}. Finally, better manufacturing techniques for UHTCs have led to better mechanical and thermal properties.

== See also ==
- International Fusion Materials Irradiation Facility#Background
- Lithium Tokamak Experiment
