= David Ruzic =

American nuclear physicist

- Born: David Neil Ruzic; February 10, 1958 (age 68)
- Education: Purdue University, Princeton University
- Occupation: Professor
- Known for: Illinois EnergyProf

David Neil Ruzic is the director of the Center of Plasma-Material Interactions at the University of Illinois at Urbana-Champaign. He was formerly a professor in the Department of Nuclear, Plasma, and Radiological Engineering (NPRE), and the Abel Bliss Professor of Engineering until 2024. In 2020, he was awarded the Gaude-Langmuir Award by the American Vacuum Society. His Youtube Channel, Illinois EnergyProf has a total of 11.2 million views.

== Education ==
David Ruzic earned his B.S. in Physics and Applied Mathematics at Purdue University in 1979. He went on to study Physics at Princeton University, earning his Ph.D. in 1984. At Purdue, he worked as a Professorial and Teaching Assistant. At Princeton, he was part of the Research staff at their Plasma Physics Lab.

== Career ==
In 1984, David Ruzic began his career at the University of Illinois at Urbana-Champaign as part of the graduate faculty for physics. In 1989, he became an associate professor for the Department of Nuclear, Plasma, and Radiological Engineering. Since then, Ruzic has acted as the assistant dean for the College of Engineering and the associate vice president of administration for the University Administration.

In 1994, Ruzic became a Professor for the Department of Nuclear Energy. In 2004, he became the director of the Center for Plasma-Material Interactions (CPMI) at UIUC.

In 2014, CPMI, led by Ruzic, acquired a fusion machine from the Max Planck Institute for Plasma Physics. After being disassembled in Germany, it was taken to UIUC and renamed HIDRA. This made UIUC one of the few universities in the world that had a fusion machine.

Ruzic launched the Illinois Plasma Institute (IPI) in conjunction with Research Park at UIUC in 2020. The purpose of IPI is to be a research initiative that brings together companies and develops new products and technology. IPI became partners with Tokyo Ohka Kogyo in 2020 and LyTen in 2021.

In 2021, the NPRE department at UIUC announced the David Neil Ruzic Undergraduate Scholarship. It was funded by friends, family, institutions, and past graduates.

== Research ==
His research interests include experimental fusion research, plasma processing, and extreme ultraviolet sources.

== Youtube ==
In October 2018, Ruzic began his Youtube channel, Illinois EnergyProf, which includes over 130 videos about renewable resources, fossil fuels, and nuclear energy, among other topics. As of October 2026, Illinois EnergyProf has 112k subscribers and 11.2 million total views.

== Awards ==
- IEEE NPSS Fusion Technology Award (2020)
- AVS Gaede-Langmuir Award (2020)
- Rose Award for Teaching Excellence (2019)
- AVS Plasma Award (2015)
- AVS Plasma Science & Technology Division Plasma Prize (2012)
- UIUC Campus Award for Excellence in Guiding Undergraduate Research
- Honorary Knight by The Knights of Saint Patrick at UIUC (1996)
- Hertz Foundation Fellow (1979)
- Fellow American Nuclear Society (2010)
- Fellow American Vacuum Society (2007)
- Fellow American Physical Society (2014)
- Fellow Society of Photonic and Optics Engineering (2019)
