= Herman Kingori Maingi =

Mzee Herman Kingori Maingi (1920–30 December 2009) had a diversified career with a strong bias towards the cooperative movement and the agricultural sector.

== Early life ==
Mzee Herman Kingori Maingi was born in 1920 at Karima village in Othaya Division, Nyeri District. He was the first born among three brothers and four sisters. His parents were Benjamin Maingi and Mary Waithera.

He received his formal education at Karima Mission School in the early 1930s. He furthered his education by attending many seminars, workshops and short training courses in the field of agriculture both locally and abroad.

Mzee's first encounter with Christianity was when he was in the Military service for the British Army. He attended catechism and was baptised on 2 December 1944 at Lanet Military Barracks. He also received his first holy communion and confirmation on the same day.

== Education sector involvement ==
His achievements in public particularly in the education sector are many. He was a founding member and chairman of Karima & Gura primary schools. He also spearheaded the founding of Karima Boys High School and Othaya Girls High School in which he served as a board member for several years. By the time of his death he had seen the two high schools transformed from Harambee Schools to Government Provincial Schools. Mzee also served in the board of Kagumo High School for five years. He helped see several children through school.

== Cooperative movement and Agricultural sector work ==
Having been raised in a rural set up, Mzee had a passion for farming. He kept grade cattle and was among the first few Kenyans who planted coffee as a cash crop in 1957. In 1964, when the cooperative union was formed, because of his success in farming, he was elected as a factory manager at Ichamama Coffee Factory. In 1974, he was elected to the large Othaya Farmers Cooperative Society management where he served in various capacities including that of chairman for 19 years. Among his other achievements include:

1. Chairman - Nyeri District Cooperative Union
2. Director, Coffee Research Foundation
3. Director, Coffee Board of Kenya
4. Director, Kenya Planters Cooperative Union
5. Director, Taifa Sacco
6. Delegate, Cooperative Bank of Kenya
7. Member, Othaya Land Control Board

In recognition of his long public service, he was granted a Head of State Commendation(HSC) by Retired President Daniel arap Moi in 1989.

== Politics ==
Herman Kingori ventured into politics in 1979 and was elected as a councilor for Karima ward and re-elected again in 1983. In 1974 he was instrumental in convincing the MP for Bahati, (later President) Mwai Kibaki to return home and vie for the Othaya parliamentary seat.

== Personal life ==
Herman Kingori was married to Agnes Wangui in 1948. They later solemnized their marriage on 15 January 1956 at Karima Catholic Mission. Together they had nine children namely; Maingi, Samuel Wanjohi, Robert Mwangi, Peter Wamburi, John Mugothi, Mary Waithera, Jacinta Wangui, Alice Wagaki and Richard Kihato. They nurtured their children into responsible and respectable adults. Mzee had twenty grandchildren who he loved and devoted lot of his time to, socialising and counselling with them.

He lived by the phrase " A man's success is not how much money he has made, but what kind of family he has brought up".

Mzee had diabetes, which was managed through proper diet and regular medical check-ups. In the last quarter of the year 2009, his health deteriorated and he was admitted to hospital. He died on 30 December 2009, and was buried on Saturday 9 January 2010.
