= H-1NF =

H-1 heliac
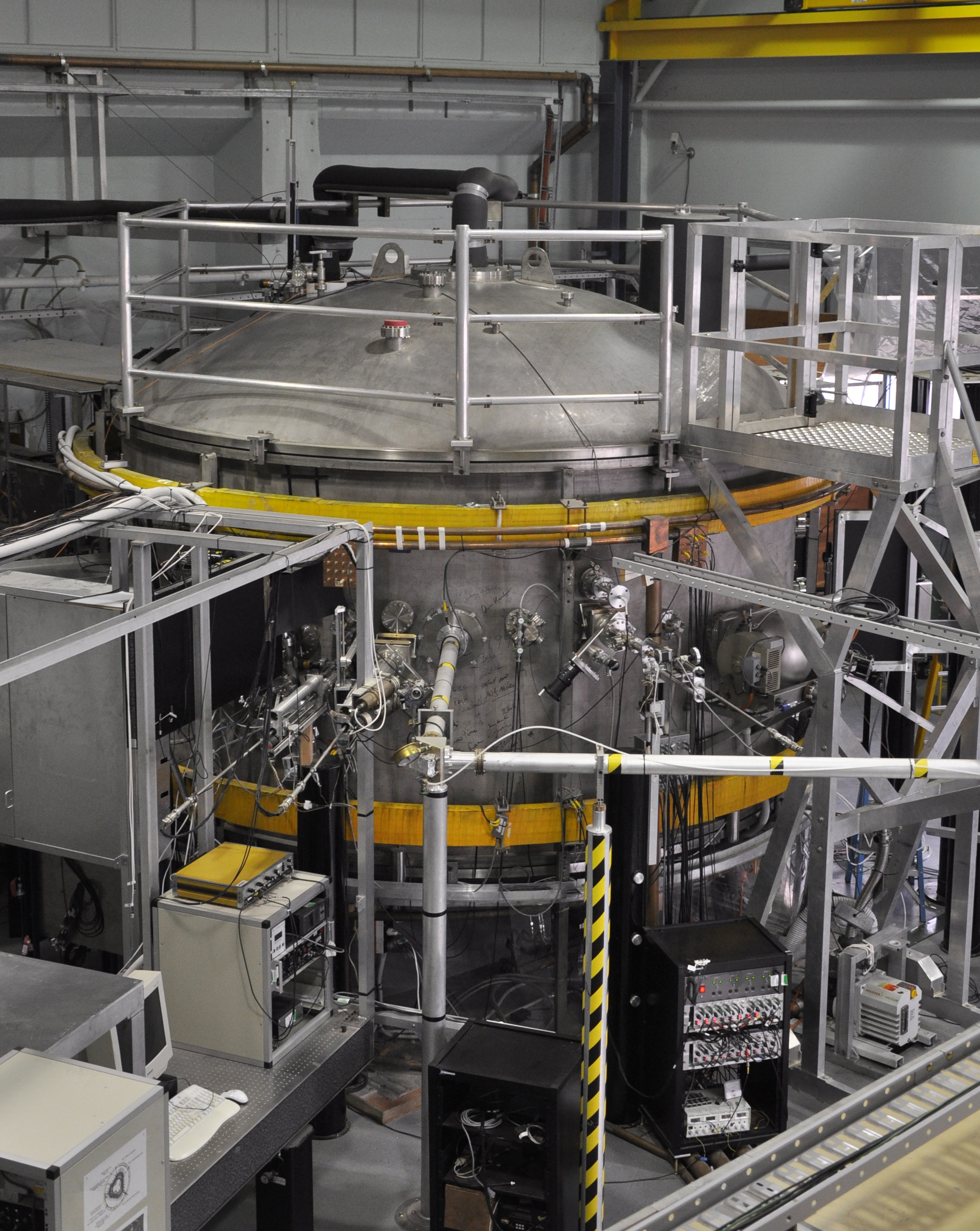
- Device type: Stellarator
- Location: Canberra, Australia

Technical specifications
- Major radius: 1.0 m (3 ft 3 in)
- Minor radius: 0.2 m (7.9 in)
- Magnetic field: 0.5 T (5,000 G)

History
- Year(s) of operation: 1992–2022
- Preceded by: SHEILA heliac

The H-1NF (or Heliac-1 National Facility) was a research institute of the H-1 heliac, a large stellarator device located in the ANU Research School of Physics at Canberra, Australia. It was established when the H-1 heliac was promoted to a national facility in 1996, adopting H-1NF as its facility name ("H-1" from the stellarator and "NF" for National Facility). In 2022 the H-1 heliac was disassembled before being shipped to its new home in China.

== H-1 heliac stellarator ==
The H-1 flexible Heliac is a three field-period helical axis stellarator. Optimisation of the H-1 power supplies for low current ripple allows precise control of the ratio of secondary (helical, vertical) coil to primary (poloidal, toroidal) coil currents, resulting in a finely tunable magnetic geometry. Slight variation in the current ratio between shots (plasma discharges) in a sequence corresponds to a high resolution parameter scan through magnetic configurations (i.e.: rotational transform profile, magnetic well). The programmable control system allows for repetition rates of around 30 shots per hour, limited by data acquisition time and magnet cooling time.

== Stated objectives ==
- Provide a high-temperature plasma national facility of international standing on a scale appropriate to Australia's research budget.
- Provide a focus for national and international collaborative research, make significant contributions to the global fusion research effort and increase the Australian presence in the field of plasma fusion power into the next century.
- Gain a detailed understanding of the basic physics of hot plasma which is magnetically confined in the helical-axis stellarator configuration.
- Develop advanced plasma measurement systems ("diagnostics"), integrating real-time processing and multi-dimensional visualization of data.
