= Lithium Tokamak Experiment =

Lithium experiment

LTX
Lithium Tokamak Experiment
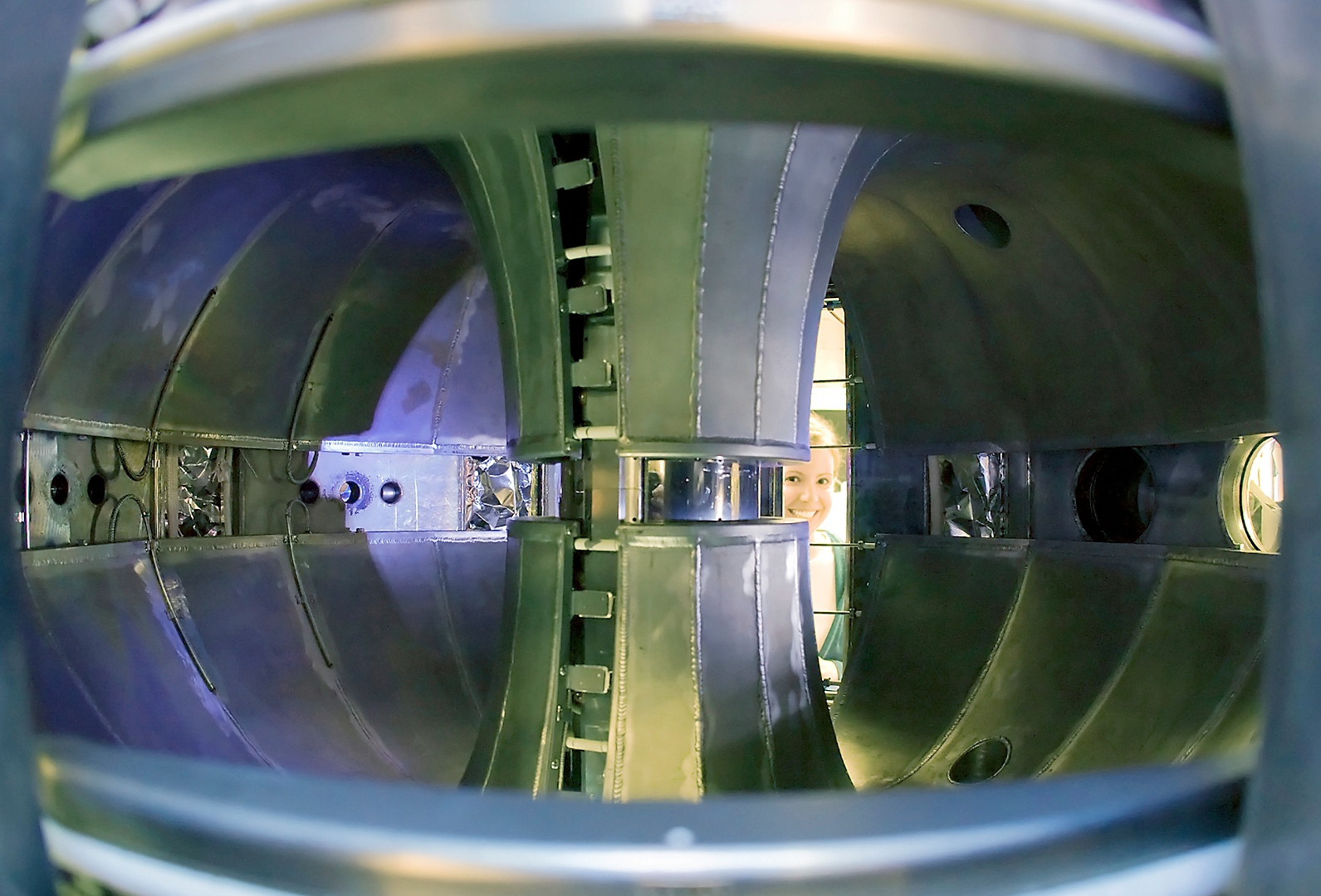
- Plasma vessel of LTX
- Device type: Tokamak
- Location: Princeton, New Jersey, United States
- Affiliation: Princeton Plasma Physics Laboratory

History
- Date(s) of construction: 2000 (as CDX-U)
- Year(s) of operation: 2008–present
- Preceded by: Current Drive Experiment-Upgrade (CDX-U)

Links
- Website: The Lithium Tokamak Experiment (LTX)

The Lithium Tokamak Experiment (LTX), and its predecessor, the Current Drive Experiment-Upgrade (CDX-U), are devices dedicated to the study of liquid lithium as a plasma-facing component (PFC) at Princeton Plasma Physics Laboratory.

== Benefits of lithium as PFC ==
One of the ongoing research issues for commercial fusion power development is the choice of material for the plasma-facing portions of the reactor vessel, also known as the first wall. Most reactors operate at the equivalent of a high vacuum and thus demand high-strength materials to resists the inward pressure of the magnets against the empty interior. Typical materials are those used in other chemical and atomic processes, like various steel alloys.

Unfortunately, these same materials have a number of disadvantages when used in fusion reactors. One major problem is that when escaped fusion fuel hits the material it cools, returning to the fuel mass at a lower temperature and cooling the fuel as a whole. This is known as "recycling". The other is that these reactions can also spall off metal atoms, and due to their high atomic mass, or "high-Z", when they are heated they give off copious amounts of X-rays which also cools the plasma fuel.

One of the attractive features of a liquid lithium PFC is that it virtually eliminates recycling. This is because lithium has a high chemical reactivity with atomic hydrogen, which is then retained in the PFC. In addition, lithium has a low atomic number, Z. This gives the lowest possible energy loss by radiation from PFC material that may end up in the plasma, because radiation increases strongly with increasing Z. Finally, flowing liquid lithium can also potentially handle the high power densities expected on reactor walls.

== Tokamak performance ==
All major tokamaks have obtained their best performance under low recycling conditions. If a fully non-recycling wall can be achieved, theory predicts that the basic nature of magnetic confinement will be changed. The temperature and density profiles, and plasma current distributions, would potentially eliminate deleterious plasma instabilities. Furthermore, the transport mechanisms causing the loss of energy and particles would be reduced, and plasmas with higher energy confinement could result.

== CDX-U ==
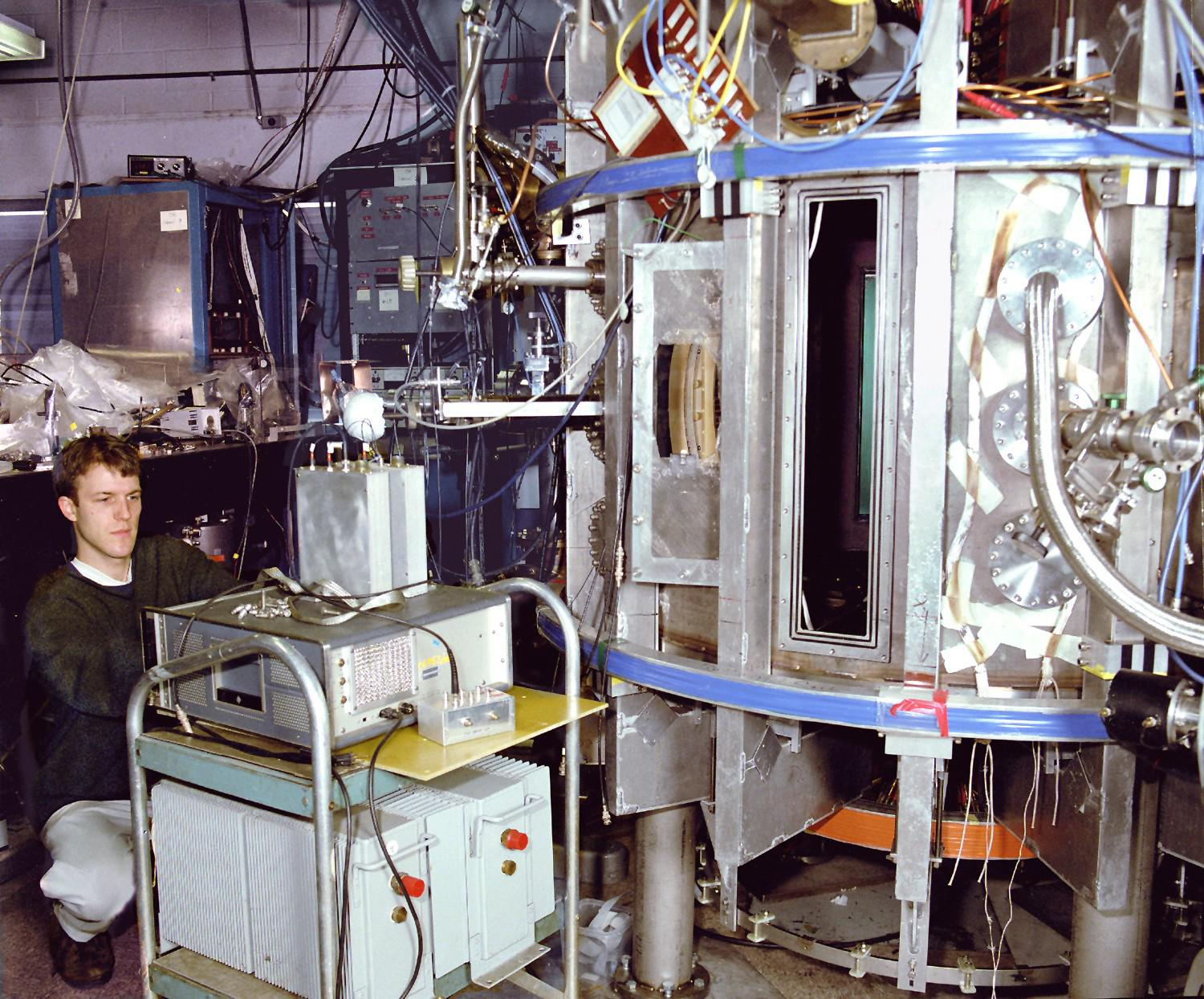
PPPL scientist at CDX-U

Operated at PPPL from 2000 to 2005.

As the first test of large area liquid lithium PFC, CDX-U had a toroidal tray on the bottom of the vacuum chamber to contain the lithium. Even with this partial non-recycling PFC, major improvements in plasma performance were obtained. Impurities were reduced, and a dramatic improvement (x6) in energy confinement was observed in 2005.

== Conversion of CDX-U to LTX ==
To achieve more a complete non-recycling PFC, the CDX-U vacuum vessel was disassembled for the installation of a heated inner shell inside it. This was a major step for the conversion of CDX-U to LTX.

LTX had its first plasma in 2008, and first run with lithium wall coatings in 2010.

=== Construction ===
The shell was fabricated out of 3/8” copper sheets, which had a stainless steel liner explosively bonded to it. The stainless steel plasma-facing surface of the inner LTX shell will be coated with lithium between shots, using an electron beam evaporator. By keeping the shell temperature above the melting point of lithium, 90% of the LTX PFC area (~5 m2) will consist of non-recycling liquid lithium.

== LTX-β ==
From 2016 to 2019 LTX was upgraded to become LTX-β. The upgrade increased the magnetic field by about two thirds, and added 500 kW of neutral beam injector heating. First results from the upgraded facility were reported in August 2020.
