= High-confinement mode =

Type of plasma state achievable in tokamak research

In plasma physics and magnetic confinement fusion, the high-confinement mode (H-mode) is a phenomenon observed in toroidal plasmas such as tokamaks where the particle and energy confinement is significantly enhanced. Toroidal fusion plasmas generally exhibit a degradation of confinement properties with applied plasma heating (such as neutral beam injection). Above a certain heating power threshold, the plasma discharge transitions to H-mode with a sudden increase in particle and energy confinement of the plasma. The opposite situation without such transition is called low-confinement mode (L-mode).

The H-mode phenomenon was discovered in 1982 on the ASDEX diverted tokamak. It has since been reproduced in all major toroidal confinement devices, and is foreseen to be the baseline operational scenario of many future reactors (such as ITER and SPARC).

The physical origin of H-mode is an open problem in plasma physics. H-mode plasma edge features a narrow region of reduced turbulent transport and enhanced thermodynamic gradients (density, temperature and pressure), known as the edge transport barrier or the pedestal. The reduction of turbulence is thought to be caused by stabilizing mechanisms related to the magnetic shear at the plasma edge. The steep profile gradients at the edge also drive a particular form of magnetohydrodynamic instability termed edge localized modes.

== Physical properties ==
=== L-H transition ===
Plasma confinement degrades as the applied heating power is increased (referred to as the low-confinement mode, or the L-mode). Above a critical power threshold that crosses the plasma boundary, the plasma transitions to H-mode where the confinement time approximately doubles.

=== Edge transport barrier ===
In the H-mode, an edge transport barrier forms where turbulent transport is reduced and the pressure gradient is increased.

=== Edge-localized modes ===
The steep pressure gradients in the edge pedestal region leads to a new type of magnetohydrodynamic instability called the edge-localized modes (ELMs), which appear as fast periodic bursts of particle and energy in the plasma edge.

=== Energy confinement scaling ===
H-mode is the foreseen operating regime for most future tokamak reactor designs. The physics basis of ITER rely on the empirical ELMy H-mode energy confinement time scaling. One such scaling named IPB98(y,2) reads:

$$\tau_{E}^{\text{IPB98(y,2)}}=0.0562 M^{0.19} I_{\text{P}}^{0.93} R^{1.97} \epsilon^{0.58} \kappa^{0.78} n^{0.41} B^{0.15} P^{-0.69}$$

where

- $M$ is the hydrogen isotopic mass number
- $I_{\text{P}}$ is the plasma current in $\text{MA}$
- $R$ is the major radius in $\text{m}$
- $\epsilon$ is the inverse aspect ratio
- $\kappa$ is the plasma elongation
- $n$ is the line-averaged plasma density in $10^{19} \text{m}^{-3}$
- $B$ is the toroidal magnetic field in $\text{T}$
- $P$ is the total heating power in $\text{MW}$
