= TJ-II =

Tokamak de la Junta II
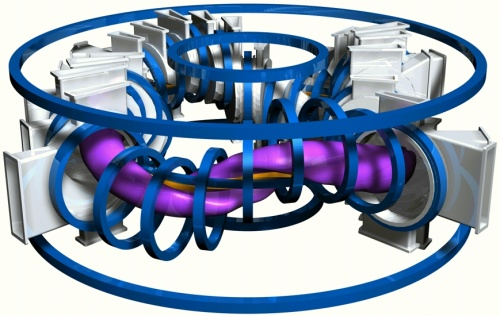
- CAD drawing of TJ-II
- Device type: Stellarator
- Location: Madrid, Spain
- Affiliation: National Fusion Laboratory of Spain

Technical specifications
- Major radius: 1.5 m (4 ft 11 in)
- Minor radius: 0.2 m (7.9 in)
- Plasma volume: 1 m^{3}
- Magnetic field: 1 T (10,000 G)
- Heating power: 2 MW
- Discharge duration: 0.2 s

History
- Date(s) of construction: 1991 – 1996
- Year(s) of operation: 1997–present
- Preceded by: TJ-I
- Related devices: TJ-K

Links
- Website: https://www.fusion.ciemat.es/inicio/tj-ii/

TJ-II is a flexible Heliac installed at Spain's National Fusion Laboratory.

Its first plasma run was in 1998, and as of 2024 is still operational.

== History ==
The flexible Heliac TJ-II was designed on the basis of calculations performed by the team of physicists and engineers of CIEMAT, in collaboration with the Oak Ridge National Laboratory (ORNL, USA) and the Max Planck Institute of Plasma Physics (IPP, Germany). The TJ-II project received preferential support from the European Atomic Energy Community (EURATOM) for phase I (Physics) in 1986 and for phase II (Engineering) in 1990. The construction of this flexible Heliac was carried out in parts according to its constitutive elements, which were commissioned to various European companies, although 60% of the investments reverted to Spanish companies.

=== Precedents ===
TJ-II is the third magnetic confinement device in a series. In 1983, the device TJ-I was taken into operation. The denomination of this device is due to the abbreviation of "Tokamak de la Junta de Energía Nuclear", this being the former denomination of CIEMAT. The abbreviation was maintained for successive devices for administrative reasons.

In 1994, the torsatron TJ-IU was taken into operation. This was the first magnetic confinement device entirely built in Spain. Currently, TJ-IU is located at the University of Stuttgart in Germany under the name of TJ-K (the 'K' stands for Kiel, its first location in Germany, before arriving in Stuttgart).

== Description ==
In TJ-II, the magnetic trap is obtained by means of various sets of coils that completely determine the magnetic surfaces before plasma initiation. The toroidal field is created by 32 coils. The three-dimensional twist of the central axis of the configuration is generated by means of two central coils: one circular and one helical. The vertical position of the plasma is controlled by the vertical field coils. The combined action of these magnetic fields generate bean-shaped magnetic surfaces that guide the particles of the plasma so that they do not collide with the vacuum vessel wall.

=== Parameters ===
It is a four period low magnetic shear stellarator with major radius R = 1.5 m, average minor radius a < 0.22 m, and magnetic field on axis up to 1.2 T.

It is 'flexible' because varying the currents in the central circular and helical coils changes the magnetic configuration (iota ≈ 1.28 – 2.24) and plasma shape and sizes (plasma volume ≈ 0.6 – 1.1 m^{3}).

It has 32 toroidal coils (in a rounded square shape), and 4 poloidal coils (2 above and 2 below), and 2 helical coils around the 'central conductor'. The central conductor is inside the toroidal coils and the plasma and vacuum vessel forms a helix around it.

It can produce a 0.25s pulse every 7 mins.

== Goals and Research ==
The objective of the experimental program of TJ-II is to investigate the physics of plasma in a device with a helical magnetic axis having a great flexibility in its magnetic configuration, and to contribute to the international effort regarding the study of magnetic confinement devices for fusion.

=== Experiment ===
- Transport and magnetic configuration, iota effects
- Confinement transitions, zonal flows
- Internal Transport Barriers
- Plasma Wall Interaction (in 2008 it experimented with lithium wall components).
- Impurity transport
- Instabilities
- Turbulence

=== Theory ===
- Neoclassical transport
- Self-Organised Criticality
- Non-diffusive transport
- Gyrokinetic simulations
- Divertor studies for TJ-II
- Topology and transport (research project funded by the Ministerio de Ciencia e Innovación)
