= Compass (disambiguation) =

A compass is a navigational instrument that indicates the direction to the magnetic poles.

Compass may also refer to:

== Tools ==
- Compass calipers, a tool to measure distances on a chart or map
- Compass (drawing tool), a tool to inscribe circles and arcs

== Art and entertainment ==
- Compass (novel), a 2015 novel by Mathias Enard
- Compass (Hudson), a 2005 public artwork by American artist Jon Barlow Hudson
- Compass (Simpson), a 2003 public art work by American artist Gail Simpson
- Compass Players (or Compass Theater), a 1950s improvised cabaret revue in Chicago, Illinois

=== Music ===
- Compass or range, of a voice or musical instrument
- Compass (band), a Chinese rock band
- Compass (Assemblage 23 album), 2009
- Compass (Jamie Lidell album), 2010
- Compass (Mark Vincent album), 2010
  - "Compass" (Mark Vincent song), 2010 (later recorded by Didrik Solli-Tangen, and Sam Bailey)
- Compass (Joshua Redman album), 2013
- "Compass" (Lady Antebellum song), 2013
- Compass Records, an independent record label founded in 1995
- "Compass", a song by Dala from the album Everyone Is Someone
- "Compass", a song by Jonathan Thulin from the album Science Fiction
- "Compass", a song by Rascal Flatts from the album Rewind
- "Compass", a song by Zella Day from the album Kicker
- "Compass", a song by Mili, made for Limbus Company

=== Television ===
- Compass (1965 TV program), a 1965–1966 Canadian documentary television program
- Compass (1986 TV program), a 1986 local Canadian television news program about Prince Edward Island
- Compass (Australian TV program), a 1988 Australian news-documentary television program
- Compass (Falling Skies), an episode of the American television drama series Falling Skies

== Business and organizations ==
- Compass, Inc., an American real estate brokerage
- Compass (think tank), a British political think tank
- Compass Datacenters inc., a datacenter company
- Compass Airlines (Australia), operated 1990–1993
- Compass Airlines (North America), a subsidiary of Delta Air Lines
- Compass Design Automation, a former integrated circuit design company
- Compass Group, a British food-service and facilities-management company
- Compass International Pictures, an American film-distribution company
- Massachusetts Computer Associates, also known as COMPASS
- Project Compass, a British programme to help ex-service personnel

== Nature ==
- Compass cactus or barrel cactus, members of the genera Echinocactus and Ferocactus
- Compass plant (Silphium laciniatum), a kind of sunflower
- Pyxis, abbreviated from Pyxis Nautica, Latin for mariner's compass, southern constellation

== Publications ==
- The Daily Compass, a 1949–1952 New York City, New York, newspaper
- Social Work (journal), an academic journal known as The Compass from 1920 to 1948

== Science and technology ==
=== Navigation ===
- Brunton compass, type of precision magnetic compass
- Breithaupt compass or Geological compass
- Hand compass, any compact magnetic compass capable of one-hand use
- Radio direction finder, a tool used in direction finding that coincides with radio communications
- An alternative name of BeiDou Navigation Satellite System, which used the satellite Compass-M1

=== Traffic ===
- Compass Card (San Diego), the original name of a contactless smart card used for public transit in San Diego, California
- Compass Card (TransLink), an electronic payment system used for public transit in Vancouver, Canada
- COMPASS, the Freeway Traffic Management System, a traffic management system in Canada

=== Other ===
- COMPASS (computer system) used by Bank of England
- Compass (architecture), a curved circular form
- COMPASS or COMPrehensive ASSembler, a programming language for CDC mainframe computers in the 1960s and 1970s
- COMPASS experiment or Common Muon and Proton Apparatus for Structure and Spectroscopy, a particle physics experiment at CERN
- COMPASS tokamak, an experimental facility of Tokamak department of Institute of Plasma Physics AS CR
- Grid Compass, the first laptop computer
- Jeep Compass, a compact crossover SUV
- Compass Project is the former name of Elasticsearch, a Java search engine framework
- An alternative name of BeiDou Navigation Satellite System, which used the satellite Compass-M1

== Other uses ==
- Compass (law), to purpose (or intend) something
- Compass, Pennsylvania, United States
- Operation Compass, a World War II military operation in the North African campaign
- Political compass, a multi-axis model used to label or organize political thought

== See also ==
- Compas (disambiguation)
