= Plasma diagnostics =

Physics measurement techniques

Plasma diagnostics are a pool of methods, instruments, and experimental techniques used to measure properties of a plasma, such as plasma components' density, distribution function over energy (temperature), their spatial profiles and dynamics, which enable to derive plasma parameters.

== Invasive probe methods ==
=== Ball-pen probe ===
A ball-pen probe is novel technique used to measure directly the plasma potential in magnetized plasmas. The probe was invented by Jiří Adámek in the Institute of Plasma Physics AS CR in 2004. The ball-pen probe balances the electron saturation current to the same magnitude as that of the ion saturation current. In this case, its floating potential becomes identical to the plasma potential. This goal is attained by a ceramic shield, which screens off an adjustable part of the electron current from the probe collector due to the much smaller gyro–radius of the electrons. The electron temperature is proportional to the difference of ball-pen probe(plasma potential) and Langmuir probe (floating potential) potential. Thus, the electron temperature can be obtained directly with high temporal resolution without additional power supply.

=== Faraday cup ===
The conventional Faraday cup is applied for measurements of ion (or electron) flows from plasma boundaries and for mass spectrometry.

=== Langmuir probe ===
Measurements with electric probes, called Langmuir probes, are the oldest and most often used procedures for low-temperature plasmas. The method was developed by Irving Langmuir and his co-workers in the 1920s, and has since been further developed in order to extend its applicability to more general conditions than those presumed by Langmuir. Langmuir probe measurements are based on the estimation of current versus voltage characteristics of a circuit consisting of two metallic electrodes that are both immersed in the plasma under study. Two cases are of interest: (a) The surface areas of the two electrodes differ by several orders of magnitude. This is known as the single-probe method. (b) The surface areas are very small in comparison with the dimensions of the vessel containing the plasma and approximately equal to each other. This is the double-probe method.

Conventional Langmuir probe theory assumes collisionless movement of charge carriers in the space charge sheath around the probe. Further it is assumed that the sheath boundary is well-defined and that beyond this boundary the plasma is completely undisturbed by the presence of the probe. This means that the electric field caused by the difference between the potential of the probe and the plasma potential at the place where the probe is located is limited to the volume inside the probe sheath boundary.

The general theoretical description of a Langmuir probe measurement requires the simultaneous solution of the Poisson equation, the collision-free Boltzmann equation or Vlasov equation, and the continuity equation with regard to the boundary condition at the probe surface and requiring that, at large distances from the probe, the solution approaches that expected in an undisturbed plasma.

=== Magnetic (B-dot) probe ===
If the magnetic field in the plasma is not stationary, either because the plasma as a whole is transient or because the fields are periodic (radio-frequency heating), the rate of change of the magnetic field with time ($\dot B$, read "B-dot") can be measured locally with a loop or coil of wire. Such coils exploit Faraday's law, whereby a changing magnetic field induces an electric field. The induced voltage can be measured and recorded with common instruments. Also, by Ampere's law, the magnetic field is proportional to the currents that produce it, so the measured magnetic field gives information about the currents flowing in the plasma. Both currents and magnetic fields are important in understanding fundamental plasma physics.

=== Energy analyzer ===
An energy analyzer is a probe used to measure the energy distribution of the particles in a plasma. The charged particles are typically separated by their velocities from the electric and/or magnetic fields in the energy analyzer, and then discriminated by only allowing particles with the selected energy range to reach the detector.

Energy analyzers that use an electric field as the discriminator are also known as retarding field analyzers. It usually consists of a set of grids biased at different potentials to set up an electric field to repel particles lower than the desired amount of energy away from the detector. Analyzers with cylindrical or conical face-field can be more effective in such measurements.

In contrast, energy analyzers that employ the use of a magnetic field as a discriminator are very similar to mass spectrometers. Particles travel through a magnetic field in the probe and require a specific velocity in order to reach the detector. These were first developed in the 1960s, and are typically built to measure ions. (The size of the device is on the order the particle's gyroradius because the discriminator intercepts the path of the gyrating particle.)

The energy of neutral particles can also be measured by an energy analyzer, but they first have to be ionized by an electron impact ionizer.

=== Proton radiography ===
Proton radiography uses a proton beam from a single source to interact with the magnetic field and/or the electric field in the plasma and the intensity profile of the beam is measured on a screen after the interaction. The magnetic and electric fields in the plasma deflect the beam's trajectory and the deflection causes modulation in the intensity profile. From the intensity profile, one can measure the integrated magnetic field and/or electric field.

=== Self Excited Electron Plasma Resonance Spectroscopy (SEERS) ===
Nonlinear effects like the I-V characteristic of the boundary sheath are utilized for Langmuir probe measurements but they are usually neglected for modelling of RF discharges due to their very inconvenient mathematical treatment. The Self Excited Electron Plasma Resonance Spectroscopy (SEERS) utilizes exactly these nonlinear effects and known resonance effects in RF discharges. The nonlinear elements, in particular the sheaths, provide harmonics in the discharge current and excite the plasma and the sheath at their series resonance characterized by the so-called geometric resonance frequency.

SEERS provides the spatially and reciprocally averaged electron plasma density and the effective electron collision rate. The electron collision rate reflects stochastic (pressure) heating and ohmic heating of the electrons.

The model for the plasma bulk is based on 2d-fluid model (zero and first order moments of Boltzmann equation) and the full set of the Maxwellian equations leading to the Helmholtz equation for the magnetic field. The sheath model is based additionally on the Poisson equation.

== Passive spectroscopy ==
Passive spectroscopic methods simply observe the radiation emitted by the plasma. They can be collected by diagnostics such as the filterscope, which is used in various tokamak devices.

=== Doppler shift ===
If the plasma (or one ionic component of the plasma) is flowing in the direction of the line of sight to the observer, emission lines will be seen at a different frequency due to the Doppler effect.

=== Doppler broadening ===
The thermal motion of ions will result in a shift of emission lines up or down, depending on whether the ion is moving toward or away from the observer. The magnitude of the shift is proportional to the velocity along the line of sight. The net effect is a characteristic broadening of spectral lines, known as Doppler broadening, from which the ion temperature can be determined.

=== Stark effect ===
The splitting of some emission lines due to the Stark effect can be used to determine the local electric field.

=== Stark broadening ===
Irrespectively of the presence of macroscopic electric fields, any single atom is affected by microscopic electric fields due to the neighboring charged plasma particles. This results in the Stark broadening of spectral lines that can be used to determine the plasma density.

=== Spectral line ratios ===
The brightness of spectral lines emitted by atoms in a plasma depends on the plasma temperature and density.

If a sufficiently complete collisional radiative model is used, the temperature (and, to a lesser degree, density) of plasmas can often be inferred by taking ratios of the emission intensities of various atomic spectral lines.

=== Zeeman effect ===
The presence of a magnetic field splits the atomic energy levels due to the Zeeman effect. This leads to broadening or splitting of spectral lines. Analyzing these lines can, therefore, yield the magnetic field strength in the plasma.

== Active spectroscopy ==
Active spectroscopic methods stimulate the plasma atoms in some way and observe the result (emission of radiation, absorption of the stimulating light or others).

=== Absorption spectroscopy ===
By shining through the plasma a laser with a wavelength, tuned to a certain transition of one of the species present in the plasma, the absorption profile of that transition could be obtained. This profile provides information not only for the plasma parameters, that could be obtained from the emission profile, but also for the line-integrated number density of the absorbing species.

=== Beam emission spectroscopy ===
A beam of neutral atoms is fired into a plasma. Some atoms are excited by collisions within the plasma and emit radiation. This can be used to probe density fluctuations in a turbulent plasma.

=== Charge exchange recombination spectroscopy ===
In extremely high-temperature plasmas, such as those found in magnetic fusion experiments, light elements become fully ionized and do not emit line radiation. However, when a beam of neutral atoms is fired into the plasma, a process known as charge exchange occurs. During charge exchange, electrons from the neutral beam atoms are transferred to the highly energetic plasma ions, leading to the formation of hydrogenic ions. These newly formed ions promptly emit line radiation, which is subsequently analyzed to obtain information about the plasma, including ion density, temperature, and velocity.

One example of this is the Fast-Ion Deuterium-Alpha (FIDA) method employed in tokamaks. In this technique, charge exchange occurs between the neutral beam atoms and the fast deuterium ions present in the plasma. This method exploits the substantial Doppler shift exhibited by Balmer-alpha light emitted by the energetic atoms in order to determine the density of the fast ions.

=== Laser-induced fluorescence ===
Laser-induced fluorescence (LIF) is a spectroscopic technique employed for the investigation of plasma properties by observing the fluorescence emitted when the plasma is stimulated by laser radiation. This method allows for the measurement of plasma parameters such as ion flow, ion temperature, magnetic field strength, and plasma density. Typically, tunable dye lasers are utilized to carry out these measurements. The pioneering application of LIF in plasma physics occurred in 1975 when researchers used it to measure the ion velocity distribution function in an argon plasma. Various LIF techniques have since been developed, including the one-photon LIF technique and the two-photon absorption laser-induced fluorescence (TALIF).

==== Two-photon absorption laser-induced fluorescence ====
TALIF is a modification of the laser-induced fluorescence technique. In this approach, the upper energy level is excited through the absorption of two photons, and subsequent fluorescence resulting from the radiative decay of the excited level is observed. TALIF is capable of providing precise measurements of absolute ground state atomic densities, such as those of hydrogen, oxygen, and nitrogen. However, achieving such precision necessitates appropriate calibration methods, which can be accomplished through titration or a more modern approach involving a comparison with a noble gases.

TALIF also offers insight into the temperature of species within the plasma, apart from atomic densities. However, this requires the use of lasers with a high spectral resolution to distinguish the Gaussian contribution of temperature broadening against the natural broadening of the two-photon excitation profile and the spectral broadening of the laser itself.

=== Photodetachment ===
Photodetachment combines Langmuir probe measurements with an incident laser beam. The incident laser beam is optimised, spatially, spectrally, and pulse energy, to detach an electron bound to a negative ion. Langmuir probe measurements are conducted to measure the electron density in two situations, one without the incident laser and one with the incident laser. The increase in the electron density with the incident laser gives the negative ion density.

=== Motional Stark effect ===
If an atom is moving in a magnetic field, the Lorentz force will act in opposite directions on the nucleus and the electrons, just as an electric field does. In the frame of reference of the atom, there is an electric field, even if there is none in the laboratory frame. Consequently, certain lines will be split by the Stark effect. With an appropriate choice of beam species and velocity and of geometry, this effect can be used to determine the magnetic field in the plasma.

== Optical effects from free electrons ==
The optical diagnostics above measure line radiation from atoms. Alternatively, the effects of free charges on electromagnetic radiation can be used as a diagnostic.

=== Electron cyclotron emission ===
In magnetized plasmas, electrons will gyrate around magnetic field lines and emit cyclotron radiation. The frequency of the emission is given by the cyclotron resonance condition. In a sufficiently thick and dense plasma, the intensity of the emission will follow Planck's law, and only depend on the electron temperature.

=== Faraday rotation ===
The Faraday effect will rotate the plane of polarization of a beam passing through a plasma with a magnetic field in the direction of the beam. This effect can be used as a diagnostic of the magnetic field, although the information is mixed with the density profile and is usually an integral value only.

=== Interferometry ===
If a plasma is placed in one arm of an interferometer, the phase shift will be proportional to the plasma density integrated along the path.

=== Thomson scattering ===
Scattering of laser light from the electrons in a plasma is known as Thomson scattering. The electron temperature can be determined very reliably from the Doppler broadening of the laser line. The electron density can be determined from the intensity of the scattered light, but a careful absolute calibration is required. Although Thomson scattering is dominated by scattering from electrons, since the electrons interact with the ions, in some circumstances information on the ion temperature can also be extracted.

== Neutron diagnostics ==
Fusion plasmas using D-T fuel produce 3.5 MeV alpha particles and 14.1 MeV neutrons. By measuring the neutron flux, plasma properties such as ion temperature and fusion power can be determined.

== See also ==
- Laser schlieren deflectometry
