= The Compass =

The Compass may refer to:

- The Daily Compass, a New York City newspaper published from 1949 to 1952
- The Compass, Log and Lead, a 2006 album by Fred Frith, Carla Kihlstedt and Stevie Wishart
- Social Work (journal), an academic journal, known from 1920 until 1948 as The Compass

== See also ==
- Compass (disambiguation)
