= Bereavement group =

Type of support group for grief

Bereavement groups, or grief groups, are a type of support group that bereaved individuals may access to have a space to process through or receive social support around grief. Bereavement groups are typically one of the most common services offered to bereaved individuals, encompassing both formalized group therapy settings for reducing clinical levels of grief as well as support groups that offer support, information, and exchange between those who have experienced loss.

Bereavement groups started from models of peer support for widows in the 1960s. From the start, these groups were diverse in facilitation format and offered at organizations such as churches. Such groups gained popularity in subsequent decades, such that they now are typically led by a designated trained facilitator.

Social support is a key therapeutic element of bereavement groups. Groups can enhance social support that is received within groups among bereaved group members, as well as group members' perceptions of and ability to ask for and receive social support from their loved ones outside of group. These forms of social support might span emotional, logistical, and practical needs. Additionally, bereavement groups also facilitate meaning-making processes by allowing members to reconstruct narratives of themselves and their lives after loss.

There exist two main types of bereavement groups today: those that offer general forms of support and those that are based in a specific psychotherapy modality. General support groups are highly variable but may provide psychoeducation, coping strategies, and problem-solving for issues after loss. On the other hand, psychotherapy groups draw from evidence-based treatments that are delivered in a group format. Psychotherapy groups for loss include cognitive-behavioral, interpersonal, complicated grief treatment, and interpretative therapy groups.

Despite the widespread offering and use of bereavement support groups, limited scientific evidence supports their effectiveness. Analyses of several randomized control trials of bereavement groups have suggested that they yield only small improvements in psychological distress and no long-term improvements. More broadly speaking, there is a lack of empirical consensus for which clinical services are beneficial for bereaved individuals. Still, those experiencing grief have offered feedback on their perceived utility of bereavement groups, such as the greater accessibility of care, as well as criticisms that groups may add to their stress or be unequipped to address issues requiring individualized services for a mental health professional.

== Origin of bereavement groups ==
Bereavement support groups originated from the widow-to-widow mutual support program in the late 1960s. Through this program, a widow aide would provide support and serve as a role model to a newly bereaved widow in facilitating the transition to widowhood. Under a preventative public health framework of early intervention before the development of deleterious impacts, the rationale for the program was based in previous findings that new widows struggled to ask for help but found another widow's experiences most helpful.

In the ensuing decades, support groups became increasingly popular as a frontline intervention offered by hospices, churches, and organizations providing bereavement support. National organizations such as Compassionate Friends and THEOS offered self-help groups that were entirely operated by bereaved members who shared facilitation and leadership responsibilities. On the other hand, mutual support groups typically had designated leaders such as a volunteer or mental health professional.

Despite the wide adoption of this service, scientific evidence for the effectiveness of bereavement groups was limited, leading to the National Institute of Mental Health's program announcement in 1985 calling for "Prevention Research on Mutual Support Approaches with Bereaved Populations". This call led to increased research yielding mixed findings in the 1980s on whether self-help bereavement groups significantly reduced adverse mental health outcomes across depression, anxiety, and medication usage, though group members frequently reported their perceived helpfulness of groups.

Bereavement groups have since become one of the most offered services for people who have lost a loved one. The current definition of bereavement groups now draws from the criteria for group interventions that groups must be led by a designated facilitator (e.g., therapist, trained volunteer) rather than a peer according to the self-help group model.

== Therapeutic elements ==
=== Role of social support ===
Social support has been identified as one of the most critical predictors of mental health outcomes among bereaved individuals. Accordingly, social support also presents a key mechanism through which grief support groups provide benefit to the bereaved. Reflections from participants of bereavement support groups indicate that the social quality of groups was a key draw for their participation.

Participation in grief support groups may facilitate increased social support in several ways: groups themselves may serve as a form of receiving social support, but perceptions of social support from family and friends may also increase subsequent to participation in groups. Group members have the opportunity to share their feelings after loss, as well as experience their loss reactions as normal. They also receive social support from other group members about difficult interactions with loved ones following loss. By bolstering bereaved individuals' capacity for coping with the stressors associated with bereavement, social support provides a stress-buffering effect that in turn predicts fewer depressive symptoms and post-traumatic stress disorder symptoms, improved physical health, and decreased medication use, among other outcomes.

Generally speaking, research categorizes four general forms of support. Informational support may consist of logistical advice and suggestions, while instrumental support consists of more actionable forms of service or material needs including food and transportation. Appraisal support is a type of peer-to-peer contact that allows someone to understand their circumstances in interacting with others who hold shared experiences. Lastly, emotional support includes expressions of care such as empathy and validation.

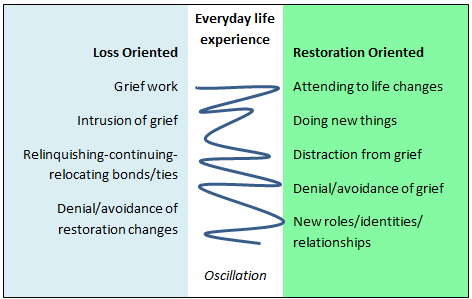
Dual process model of coping

In the context of the support provided after loss, these distinctions in types of support cohere with the widely known dual-process model of coping for grief, which distinguishes between restoration-oriented and loss-oriented coping. Restoration-oriented coping is concerned with the substantial life and logistical changes that are outcomes of loss. Examples might include taking on the tasks the deceased had been previously responsible for, assuming new roles in a family, and handling arrangements for the deceased's funeral. Informational and instrumental forms of support typically fall under restoration-oriented needs. On the other hand, loss-oriented coping is the widely recognized form of coping, focused on emotionally processing aspects of the experience of loss itself. Such coping tends to the range of emotional reactions that the loss brings, which can be supported by appraisal and emotional forms of support. Bereavement groups contain content that addresses the support required for both types of coping, including addressing logistical demands that have interfered with grieving and expressing grief-related emotions.

=== Role of meaning-making ===
Meaning-making presents another mechanism that allows for adjustment to stressful life events, though there is some disagreement on whether it is essential for adjustment. Under a constructionist view, bereaved individuals must rebuild their narratives of themselves to meet a human need for having meaning to life experiences. After loss, people may focus on learning new models of the world based on the information that experiences of loss provide—ultimately forming a consistent narrative in the transitions that loss entails. This process may be especially strained after a loss by violent or sudden means, for which the bereaved's core beliefs about the world may be altered. Other grief researchers have postulated that the bereaved who do not engage in meaning-making processes may be better off, noting a lack of empirical evidence that meaning-making is universally supportive.

In the context of grief groups, participants have expressed that being present to others' experiences highlighted their own processes of healing. For example, those bereaved by suicide may develop meaning-making by making sense of the cause and reality of their loved one's death through group participation.

== Types of bereavement groups ==
=== General support group ===
Example of postvention

Many support groups utilize basic support group principles to facilitate engagement with grief and psychoeducation on aspects of grief. Groups provide support and problem solving to aid with a return to normalcy, with a focus on increasing self-esteem and coping strategies. These groups are broadly defined and have taken various forms, but they generally aim to facilitate immediate adjustments to the changes that come with losing a loved one. For example, one group integrated the arts through written expression, storytelling, and drama scripts to support bereaved individuals. Another group focused on providing psychoeducation to decrease distress and highlight growth following loss in the context of near-death experiences. Bereavement support groups specific to those with health-related losses, such as from breast cancer and AIDS, included content on identifying stressor load, utilizing social support networks, and selecting adaptive coping strategies.

In line with its origins in public health, the nature of general support groups can be preventative before the development of adverse mental outcomes, termed "postvention" by Edwin Shneidman in the context of bereavement after suicide. One such group intervention for parents grieving the loss of their child by violent means offered detailed skills including active confrontation of grief, making progress around closure, mutual respect for grieving styles, and implementing self-care. Another general bereavement group delivered by nurses for people bereaved by suicide reduced psychological distress and enhanced social adjustment in therapeutic group activities.

=== Psychotherapy group ===
==== Cognitive-behavioral therapy group ====
Basic tenets of cognitive-behavioral therapy

Cognitive-behavioral therapy (CBT) groups are among the most common therapy groups offered to bereaved individuals. Based on a review of effective treatment protocols addressing complicated grief, CBT groups share elements of psychoeducation around normal and pathological grief, exposure to the "worst" moments of loss, and motivation for change. The CBT-specific elements of groups include addressing rumination, avoidance, and maladaptive cognitions, which have been shown to greatly reduce complicated grief symptomology compared to general groups not specific to grief. CBT grief groups may also offer skills including identifying and expressing loss-related emotions, identifying stressors and current coping strategies, setting coping-related goals, and implementing adaptive coping strategies. Such treatment tends to be short-term, lasting about 16 sessions.

==== Interpersonal therapy group ====
Interpersonal therapy (IPT) was originally developed to treat depression, but has since been adapted to address grief through a relational framework. In the context of loss, IPT groups encourage the bereaved to cope with others' reactions to loss, address guilt or blame, maintain connections to the deceased, and re-engage in interests and social relationships. Such groups address the emotional distance that bereaved individuals might feel from others who do not share their experience of grief. In contrast to general support groups, IPT does not address social support globally and instead focuses on a particular interpersonal problem related to grief in order to more increase bereaved individuals' capacity for accepting social support.

==== Complicated grief treatment group ====
Other grief groups have adapted Dr. M. Katherine Shear's Complicated Grief Treatment (CGT), which is considered a frontline treatment for complicated or prolonged grief. CGT was developed after interpersonal therapy approaches were demonstrated to be not as effective in reducing complicated grief symptoms. Based upon attachment theory, CGT integrates principles of CBT and IPT, including prolonged exposure and motivational interviewing as elements of CGT groups contain psychoeducation about normal and complicated grief, revisiting death narratives, accomplishing personal goals, and role playing a conversation with the deceased. CGT groups are typically time-limited in nature, typically about 16 sessions.

==== Interpretive therapy group ====
Interpretive therapy groups are based upon a psychodynamic orientation, emphasizing elements of conflict including desires, worries, and defenses relevant to the loss. Such therapy utilizes techniques across clarification, confrontation, and interpretation. Compared to other forms of therapy groups, interpretive group therapists are not directive in setting an agenda; instead, group members determine what to discuss at sessions. Therapists may even encourage members to continue talking and contacting difficult emotions in the context of interpersonal dynamics within the group itself. Interpretive groups aim to enhance intrapsychic insight into conflicts associated with loss and facilitate members' adjustment to loss. In a study comparing interpretive therapy groups to a general supportive group for grief, only the interpretive therapy group had lasting improvements to symptoms at a six-month follow-up.

Quality of Object Relations (QoR) is a personality variable that may affect usefulness of interpretive group therapy for participants. Specifically, QoR refers to persistent tendencies to form familiar types of relationships. Those scoring high in QoR have been found to benefit more from interpretive group therapy compared to general supportive group therapy.

== Measurement of effectiveness ==
Despite the popularity of bereavement groups as one of the most common offerings, randomized control trials testing the utility of these groups remain limited in number. Of the trials that have been conducted, findings overall provide little support for the effectiveness of bereavement groups in improving psychological outcomes.

A meta-analysis from 2022 demonstrates that, in 11 randomized control trials comparing bereavement groups and control groups, bereavement groups yielded small improvements in symptoms of prolonged or complicated grief and depression between from before and after treatment. However, when comparing symptoms of prolonged or complicated grief from before treatment and weeks after the conclusion of treatment, bereavement groups did not improve symptoms—suggesting that they have limited long-term benefits. In another 2022 review of 9 studies for bereavement support groups in bereaved parents, only 3 studies reported any changes between treatment and control group in any of 23 measured outcomes. One study of grief group participants found that participants who met criteria for Prolonged Grief Disorder (PGD) were overall less satisfied with and also gained less benefit from groups compared to bereaved participants who did not meet criteria. Another found that those who choose not to opt into a bereavement support group may have lower levels of grief and anxiety than those who do wanted to participate.

These findings are situated within a general lack of effective outcomes of bereavement services in reviews comparing several studies providing group therapies, individual counseling, and written information and resources provided to bereaved people. A systematic review of 74 studies noted that the lack of rigorous clinical trials of bereavement interventions precluded evidence-based recommendations for grief, citing incomplete reporting of interventions and methodological limitations of studies as factors contributing to a dearth of treatment recommendations.

== Advantages and criticisms ==
Even while taking into account evidence from quantitative studies that bereavement groups do not improve outcomes, feedback from bereavement group participants has still maintained that such group experiences can be positive. Participants have described that grief groups provided several advantages that include the following:

- Normalization of experience with others
- Expression of thoughts and feelings
- Reciprocity in sharing
- Exchange of advice and information
- Instilling hope

The format of grief groups can provide advantages in accessibility of services, such as decreased costs compared to individual psychotherapy. Groups can additionally be highly variable in format and structure to accommodate various needs; online grief groups, for example, have become increasingly popular. Greater accessibility of this service may allow for wider dissemination of services, particularly for hard-to-reach and marginalized conversations. However, even without official estimates of rates of bereavement group utilization, there is evidence from qualitative studies that few bereaved adults attend these groups.

Conversely, feedback from group members has also highlighted the challenges of participation in bereavement groups. For instance, people experiencing traumatic symptoms related to their losses may require specialized support from a therapist that is not conducive to group settings. Others have reported experiencing additional stress from hearing others' stories of loss. Finally, criticisms related to the structure and dissatisfaction with facilitators have also raised and may be relevant given the heterogeneity of group structures.
