= Sentinels (Hudson) =

Artwork by John Barlow Hudson

- Artist: Jon Barlow Hudson
- Year: 2005
- Dimensions: 460 cm × 120 cm × 120 cm (180 in × 48 in × 48 in)
- Location: Milwaukee; 43°3′3.993″N 87°53′21.692″W
- Owner: Milwaukee County Department of Parks, Recreation and Culture

Sentinels is a public artwork by American artist Jon Barlow Hudson, located at the bottom of the Brady Street pedestrian bridge over North Lincoln Memorial Drive, which is in Milwaukee, Wisconsin, United States. It was commissioned as a part of the Wisconsin Percent for Art Program.

== Description ==
Sentinels was constructed in March 2005 out of Wisconsin red granite. It consists of three monoliths with the tallest one being 15 feet high. Each monolith features its own unique carved design. Hudson drew his inspiration for this sculpture from ts'ung tubes, which are Chinese jade ritual objects.

== Historical information ==
Sentinels was commissioned by the Milwaukee County Department of Parks, Recreation and Culture for a competition for the new Brady Street pedestrian bridge. It is a two part sculpture with the other part Compass (Hudson) placed at the top of the pedestrian bridge.

== See also ==
- Compass (Hudson)
