= Campas =

Campas may refer to:

- Asháninka, or Campas, an ethnic group of the Amazon
- Yori Boy Campas, Mexican boxer

== See also ==
- Compas (disambiguation)
- CANPASS
