= Kompas (disambiguation) =

Kompas is an Indonesian newspaper.

Kompas may also refer to:

- KOM:PAS, a film festival held in the Czech Republic
- Kompas Gramedia Group, an Indonesian media company that owns the newspaper, TV station, and other assets
  - Kompas TV, an Indonesian private terrestrial television news broadcaster
    - Kompas (TV program), a television news program that broadcasts on Kompas TV

== See also ==
- Compass (disambiguation)
