= Charge exchange =

Process in which a neutral particle acquires an ion's charge

Charge exchange (or charge exchange collision) is a process in which a neutral atom or molecule collides with an ion, resulting in the neutral atom acquiring the charge of the ion. The terms charge transfer, electron exchange, electron transfer, and electron capture are used as synonyms for the same process. The reaction is typically expressed as

$$\ce{A+ + B -> A + B+}$$.

This reaction has various diagnostic applications, such as in plasma physics and mass spectrometry. Charge exchange is also a significant engineering concern in electric propulsion, where reactions between beam ions and un-ionized neutral propellant gas in the thruster plume produce low-energy ions that can migrate to regions of the spacecraft with no direct line of sight to the thruster, potentially causing spacecraft charging, contamination of optical and thermal surfaces, and interference with scientific instruments. Charge exchange is also of great importance in atmospheric and astrophysical studies, including the formation and destruction of ions such as H⁺, O⁺, N⁺, and N₂⁺ in the upper atmosphere, and the cycles of formation of molecules and radicals in interstellar clouds.

== Theory ==
When a neutral atom collides with an ion in a gas or a plasma, the ion can acquire an electron from the neutral atom as both electron shells overlap in the course of the collision. This includes problems encountered in the development of the quantum theory of charge exchange for light ions, in particular the significance of first- versus second-order perturbation theory in charge exchange as highlighted by the Brinkman-Kramers theory. From a fundamental point of view, charge exchange constitutes a special class of rearrangement processes that has been studied since its first identification by Henderson and Rutherford in the late 1920s. Although the first attempts at a theoretical explanation of the phenomenon emerged in the 1930s, systematic study of the field dates back to the 1950s.

An ion can also acquire electrons from a surface. The ion begins by polarising the surface from a distance, due to its long-range Coulomb potential. As it nears, the Coulomb barrier may drop below the work function of the material, allowing the transfer of electrons from the surface to the ion.

== Applications ==
=== Charge-exchange spectroscopy ===
Charge-exchange spectroscopy (abbreviated CES or CXS) is a technique commonly used in plasma diagnostics to analyze high-temperature controlled fusion plasmas. In fusion plasmas, the light elements tend to become fully ionized during operation, which makes it challenging to diagnose their properties using conventional optical diagnostics. To address this, a method was developed in the 1970s which involves the injection of a beam of neutral atoms, such as hydrogen or deuterium, into the plasma. This process results in the ionization of hydrogenic atoms the excitation of ions through charge exchange, as represented by the reaction:

$$\ce{{H^0} + A^{+q} -> {H+} + [A^{+(q-1)}]^\star}$$,

where $\ce{A^{+q}}$ represents the various possible charged states of the ions in the plasma.

Optical fibers are then strategically positioned to create "chords", lines of sight along which the measurements are taken. These chords pass through regions both with and without the neutral beam. By subtracting the signals from these two chords, emissions not generated by the neutral beam can be inferred. This allows for the determination of ion properties, such as its temperature and density.

The technique can also be extended to include multiple chords to build spatial profiles of the plasma, such as its toroidal and poloidal rotation. This provides insights into how ions conduct heat and transport momentum within the plasma.

Charge-exchange spectroscopy is often referred to as charge-exchange recombination spectroscopy, which is acronymized as CXRS or CER.

=== Solar wind charge exchange ===
Solar wind charge exchange (SWCX) is an important astrophysical process in which highly charged, heavy solar wind ions undergo charge transfer collisions with neutral atoms or molecules, producing excited product ions that emit soft X-ray and extreme ultraviolet photons. The SWCX mechanism was first recognized at comets; the first cometary X-ray observations were made for comet Hyakutake in 1996 by ROSAT, the German X-ray observatory. Charge exchange reactions between heavy solar wind ions and cometary neutrals were proposed as the mechanism responsible for the observed soft X-ray emission. The SWCX mechanism produces soft X-ray emission wherever highly charged solar wind ions encounter neutral atoms and molecules, including at Earth's magnetosheath, in planetary atmospheres, and throughout the heliosphere where the solar wind interacts with incoming interstellar neutral gas. Heliospheric SWCX emission is thought to make a significant contribution to the observed soft X-ray background.

== See also ==
- Electron capture
