= Intrapsychic humanism =

Intrapsychic humanism is a comprehensive general psychology and philosophy of mind that provides a new understanding of what it is to be human. Intrapsychic humanism is a nonderivative depth psychology that provides a unified and comprehensive theory of child development, psychopathology, and psychological treatment.

The theory is based on discoveries about the centrality of the caregiving relationship in both child development and psychological treatment. It provides an approach to psychotherapy called inner humanism which helps individuals with emotional pain achieve unconflicted pleasurable inner well-being.

The theory of intrapsychic humanism also engenders an approach to parenting called "smart love" that offers the potential to raise children who can have a conflict free, pleasurable, self-regulated experience of inner well-being, even in a world of inescapable loss.

== Authors ==
Intrapsychic humanism was developed by two psychotherapists and child development experts in Chicago, Martha Heineman Pieper and William J. Pieper. Martha earned her doctorate in social work at the School of Social Service Administration, University of Chicago. She has been a consultant to foster care and adoption agencies and has written and lectured extensively on clinical issues and the philosophy of science and research. She has served on the editorial boards of Social Work, Illinois Child Welfare, and Smith College Studies in Social Work. Heineman Pieper maintains a private practice doing psychotherapy, counseling parents, and supervising mental health professionals. She is the primary consultant to the Natalie G. Heineman Smart Love Preschool and Smart Love Family Services Mental Health Clinic.

William J. Pieper, who died in 2014, was a child and adult psychiatrist and psychoanalyst who served on the staff of Rush University Medical Center in Chicago. He completed psychiatry residencies at the University of Illinois Neuropsychiatric Institute in Chicago and the Institute for Juvenile Research in Chicago. Pieper was awarded certificates in both child and adult psychoanalysis from the Chicago Institute for Psychoanalysis. He consulted with children's agencies and hospital clinics and taught at various professional schools Pieper spent many years in private practice seeing individuals, counseling parents, and supervising mental health professionals.

== Publications ==
The Piepers’ theory was first published in a book, Intrapsychic Humanism: An Introduction to a Comprehensive Psychology and Philosophy of Mind (Falcon II Press, 1990). Subsequently, the Piepers introduced an approach to parenting called Smart Love which was first published in 1999 by The Harvard Common Press and which was reissued by Smart Love Press in 2011 as Smart Love: The Comprehensive Guide to Understanding, Regulating, and Enjoying Your Child 2.

. In addition to their books, the Piepers have authored numerous scholarly publications. The Piepers authored the column “Smart Love” for ten years in Chicago Parent. Those columns are collected in two volumes published by Smart Love Family Services: Smart Love Solutions in Early Childhood and Smart Love Solutions for School-Age Children and Teens.

== Development of the Theory ==
The Piepers concluded that prevailing theories of child development did not offer adequate answers to the perennial questions posed by parents and mental health professionals. In their research, they addressed these questions, such as: What is a baby's basic nature at birth? How much happiness can humans rightfully expect? How and why does happiness transform itself into unhappiness? In the Piepers’ words:

“… [W]e set out on our own to find answers that would allow us to be better parents and more effective professionals. We learned from the insights and dilemmas of the many parents we counseled, from our own clients, and from supervising the caseloads of other mental health professionals. We evaluated the results of the counsel we gave to parents and to foster care and adoption agencies. As another way of testing our ideas, we created and ran a successful treatment program for adolescent wards of the state who had been designated ‘untreatable’. Our research* and experience taught us that the emotional problems of children and adolescents couldn't be treated piecemeal or solely as individual behaviors that need to be modified. We found that troubled children are difficult to help because they have learned to need unhappiness. We saw that the real goal is to help troubled children turn away from needs for unhappiness as they rediscover the desires for positive relationship pleasure with which they were born,". Intrapsychic Humanism was the result of this process.

=== Basic Principles of Intrapsychic Humanism ===
==== Child Development. ====
According to Intrapsychic Humanism, infants are born with an innate motive to be the cause of the parents’ caregiving; this sense of purpose is embodied in the imagined, but yet-to-be-attained, goal of receiving ideal care from the parents. The way to understand a child's subjective experience, that is, her/his experience of being alive, of being loved and being lovable, is to understand this sense of purpose with which s/he comes into the world. The essential discovery of Intrapsychic Humanism is this particular kind of purpose which the Piepers call the intrapsychic motive. The intrapsychic motive, i.e., the motive to regulate one's own inner well-being by causing the caregiver's caregiving, drives the process through which the baby learns who s/he is, provides the lens through which s/he views the world, and ultimately defines the core meaning of subjective personal existence and leads to the core experience of well-being.

Intrapsychic Humanism is based on the assertion that every individual comes into the world innately programmed for relationship experience and that everything that happens to them has the meaning of ideal love. Every baby believes s/he is born into the best of all possible worlds—a world where ideal care is being provided. Intrapsychic Humanism is based on an understanding of this essential element of human nature and the theory identifies a type of caregiving that can offer the child the caregiving experiences that can ultimately provide her/him with the sense of fundamental, stable well-being that can last a lifetime.

Intrapsychic Humanism provides a map that allows parents and other caregivers to provide caregiving appropriate to the child's psychological development. The stages of child development as understood by Intrapsychic Humanism are: The Pre-Eidetic Stage; The Regulatory Intrapsychic Self Stage; The Regulatory Interpersonal Self Stage; and The Constitutive Interpersonal Self Stage.

==== Pre-Eidetic Stage (birth to 12-14 months): ====
The Pre-Eidetic Stage includes the smile response, stranger anxiety and separation anxiety. During this stage, the child gains the capacity to remember images of her parents to which she can then turn to feel that she is causing her parents to care for her while she explores more and more of her world. Most importantly, during this stage every experience and feeling the baby has is believed to be a result of intentional caregiving from the parent.

==== Regulatory Intrapsychic Self Stage (12-14 months to approximately 3 years) ====
Although a relatively short period of time, this stage is perhaps the most fecund period of development because the baby progresses from an innate (nature-based) experience of the parent's caregiving, to a nurture-based genuine experience of her mind that provides her with the foundation for a stable sense of well-being throughout her life. Through the parents’ stable caregiving the child comes to prefer above all the pleasure of being cared for by them and to become certain of the stability of the parents' commitment to care for her. By the end of this stage, the child will have internalized a certainty that her parents’ love for her is unshakable.

==== Regulatory Interpersonal Self Stage (approximately 3 years to 6-7 years): ====
Once the child has established a stable inner well-being, the next goal is to gain the capacity to regulate his choices in his interpersonal world, such as to play and to make friends. During the Regulatory Interpersonal Self Stage, the child goes through the romantic phase in which he/she has the illusion that he can have an exclusive romantic relationship with the opposite sex parent. Over time he comes to realize that while he/she cannot have nor regulate his parents' social motives he/she can always regulate their caregiving motives. At the end of this stage, which occurs at about ages 6 or 7, the child's growing appreciation of his parents’ steadfast discrimination between their parenting and personal commitments leads him/her to make an identification called the relationship ideal. The relationship ideal consists of ideals of intimacy and commitment in all types of relationships, including romantic love, friendship, and the parent-child relationship. It is the relationship ideal that becomes the basis for relationship choices throughout his/her life.

==== Constitutive Interpersonal Self Stage (6-7 years to early adulthood): ====
This stage is the final phase of development of the child's mind, from approximately age 6 through early adulthood (age 20–30). During this stage, the child increasingly learns to make self-caretaking choices and by the end of this phase s/he has the capacity to enjoy life, to work hard, to pursue desires and relationships, and to cope with losses or disappointments without conflict and without loss of self-esteem.

=== Psychopathology ===
As stated, all children are born with the conviction that they are causing their parents to care for them and that they are receiving ideal care. Because of this conviction and the immaturity of the child's mind, children cannot evaluate the quality of care they receive. Consequently, even if caregiving is less than ideal, it will still be experienced as ideal and pleasurable. As a result of this dynamic, our species has the ability to survive even when the caregiving is less than optimal. It also creates a vulnerability in that human beings feel loved and cared for even with destructive, abusive or neglectful caregiving. This results in a lifetime addiction to unhappiness because unhappiness is mistakenly identified as well-being. For example, young children who are abused will accept the abuse as deserved, inevitable, and, even, as ideal caregiving.

This misidentification of unhappiness as happiness explains why foster children will frequently instigate and provoke conflict with kind, well-meaning foster parents. The Piepers call this dynamic the aversive reaction to pleasure where people who have learned to need unhappiness react to genuine pleasure by unknowingly seeking out experiences of unhappiness. The aversive reaction to pleasure explains the phenomenon of people who reach the pinnacle of success and then end up self-destructing. People with unrecognized needs for unhappiness are also vulnerable when faced with disappointments or loss. In response to loss, they have difficulty comforting themselves and try to feel better by unknowingly recreating unhappy experiences, such as feeling badly about themselves, isolating, overeating, fighting or abusing others.

=== Treatment ===
Psychotherapy that is based on the theory of Intrapsychic Humanism is called inner Humanism. Even when people receive less than ideal care growing up, they still possess their innate motive for genuine well-being. The goal of Inner Humanism is to reawaken and nurture this innate motive via the caregiving relationship with the therapist. “In [Inner Humanism psychotherapy], the therapist has the caregiving pleasure of nurturing the client’s heretofore unengaged motives to experience reliable, conflict-free care-getting intimacy. The client’s experience of receiving the caregetting he/she needs acquires the meaning of an inner well-being that he/she causes and regulates. Intrapsychic care-getting pleasure refers not to an affect, but to a meaning structure of effective agency nurtured by the client’s experience of causing the therapist to want to give the emotional care the client needs and desires. The mechanism of therapeutic change is not insight, but here and now caregetting pleasure produced by the client’s experience of causing the therapist to meet her care getting needs. Over time, the superiority of this type of relationship-based self-regulation leads the client to reject as an unnecessary and unwanted loss the type of self-regulation that is based on motives for pain with the unconscious meaning of pleasure”.

A key mechanism in the therapeutic process is the aversive reaction to pleasure. The client's motives for constructive pleasure and the pleasure of the caregiving intimacy with the therapist compete with their acquired motives for unhappiness. When the client pursues constructive motives

== Footnote ==
To test the efficacy of their clinical approach, the Piepers were invited by the Illinois Department of Children and Family Services to develop a demonstration project to provide residential treatment for the most violent, anti-social adolescent wards of the state. These severely emotionally disturbed, homicidally violent adolescents had been considered untreatable.

Over the course of treatment (1974–1977), the project demonstrated that even individuals with the most severe psychopathology proved amenable to psychotherapeutic interventions based on the principles of Intrapsychic Humanism.
