= Resonant magnetic perturbations =

Non-axisymmetric magnetic fields used to control tokamak edge instabilities

Resonant magnetic perturbations (RMPs) are a special type of magnetic field perturbations used to control burning plasma instabilities called edge-localized modes (ELMs) in magnetic fusion devices such as tokamaks. The efficiency of RMPs for controlling ELMs was first demonstrated on the tokamak DIII-D in 2003.

Normally the rippled magnetic field will only suppress ELMs for very narrow ranges of the plasma current.

== See also ==
- Plasma instability – Degree to which disturbing a plasma system at equilibrium will destabilize it
- COMPASS tokamak – Tokamak fusion energy device
- NSTX-U – US nuclear fusion reactor
