= Compas (disambiguation) =

Compas is a Haitian musical genre.

Compas or COMPAS may also refer to:

== Music ==
- Compás, metre and time signature in Spanish flamenco music
- Compas (album), a 1997 album by Gipsy Kings

== Business ==
- COMPAS (software), software to predict criminal recidivism
- Grupo Compás, a Spanish petrochemical company
- Compas (polling company), a Canadian polling company

== People ==
- Rob Compas (born 1966), Dutch cyclist
- Tanya Compas, British activist

== Other ==
- Le Compas, a French commune
- Al Compás de tu Mentira, 1950 Argentine film
- Compas Pascal, an implementation of the Pascal programming language written by Anders Hejlsberg

== Acronyms ==
- Cooperation Manufacturing Plant Aguascalientes, a joint venture automobile manufacturing plant owned by Nissan and Mercedes-Benz Group
- Centre on Migration Policy and Society at the University of Oxford

== See also ==
- Compass (disambiguation)
