= COMPASS tokamak =

Tokamak fusion energy device

COMPASS Tokamak
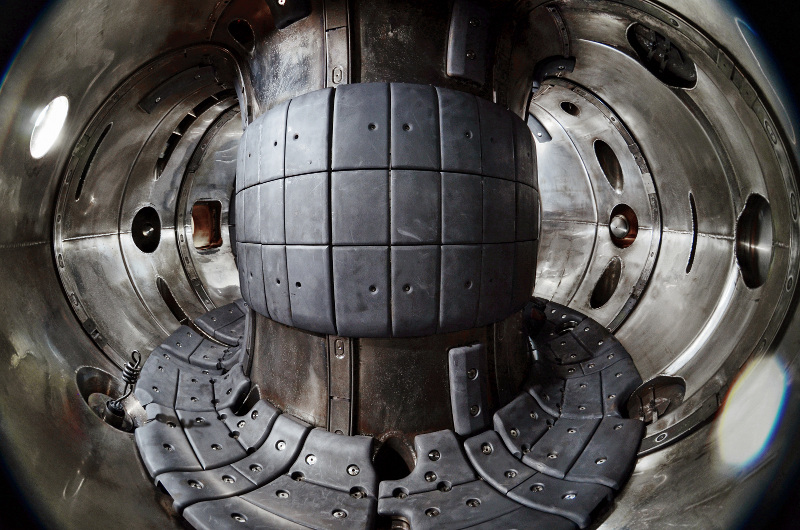
- COMPASS tokamak vacuum chamber
- Device type: Tokamak
- Location: Prague, Czech Republic
- Affiliation: Czech Academy of Sciences

Technical specifications
- Major radius: 0.56 m (1 ft 10 in)
- Minor radius: 0.23 m (9.1 in)
- Magnetic field: 0.9–2.1 T (9,000–21,000 G)
- Heating power: 2 × 0.3 MW
- Discharge duration: 0.5 s (pulsed)
- Plasma current: 360 kA

History
- Year(s) of operation: 1992–2002 (in UK); 2006–2021 (in CZ)

Links
- Website: COMPASS Tokamak
- Other links: Compass Tokamak (YouTube); The first high-speed colour video from the COMPASS tokamak (YouTube)

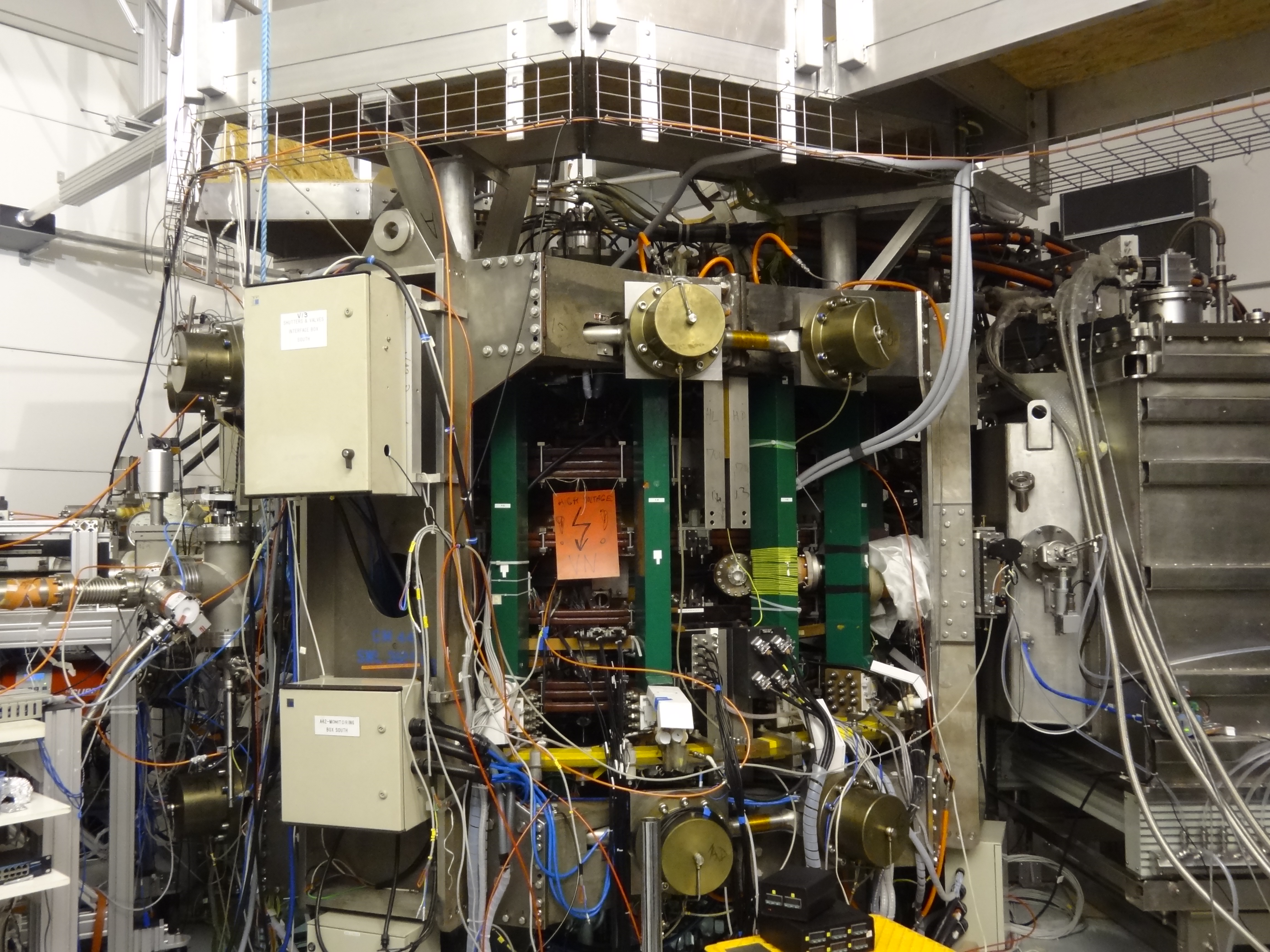
Front photograph of the COMPASS tokamak in Prague

COMPASS, short for Compact Assembly, is a compact tokamak fusion energy device originally completed at the Culham Science Centre in 1989, upgraded in 1992, and operated until 2002. It was designed as a flexible research facility dedicated mostly to plasma physics studies in circular and D-shaped plasmas.

When it was decommissioned at Culham, it was offered to the European Commission and found a new home at the Institute of Plasma Physics of the Czech Academy of Sciences in Prague where it began operations once again in 2006. It officially ended its experimental runs on 20 August 2021 and was disassembled to leave room for a new device, COMPASS-U.

== History ==
The first plasma in COMPASS was produced in 1989 in a C-shaped vacuum vessel, i.e., in a simpler vessel with a circular cross-section. Pioneering experiments followed, including for example the ITER-relevant tests of magnetic field correction with saddle coils for Resonant magnetic perturbations (RMP) experiments or experiments with non-inductive current drive in plasma.

The operation of tokamak was restarted with a D-shaped vacuum vessel in 1992. The operation mode with high plasma confinement (H-mode) was achieved, which represents a reference operation ("standard scenario") for the ITER tokamak. The COMPASS tokamak is one of the smallest tokamaks able to operate in H-mode, with a major radius 0.6 m and height of approximately 0.7 m. Due to its size and shape, the COMPASS plasmas correspond to one tenth (in the linear scale) of the ITER plasmas. Besides COMPASS, there are only two operational tokamaks in Europe with ITER-like configuration capable of H-mode, the Joint European Torus (JET) at Culham and the ASDEX Upgrade at the Institut für Plasmaphysik in Garching, Germany.

In 2002, British scientists started alternative research on larger, spherical tokamak MAST. Operation of COMPASS was discontinued due to insufficient resources for the operation of both tokamaks, however, the planned research program was not complete. The European Commission and UKAEA sent COMPASS to the Institute of Plasma Physics in Prague in the autumn of 2004. The machine restarted operations in 2006 and operated continually until its last "shot" on 20 August 2021. During its operational time in Prague, COMPASS carried out 21,000 experimental shots.

After August 2021, COMPASS was disassembled to make way for a significantly larger machine, COMPASS-U (for Upgrade). Its construction is currently (May 2024) underway.

== COMPASS and COMPASS-U ==
Parameters	Values	Values after planned upgrade in 2021
Major radius R	0.56 m	0.84 m
Minor radius a	0.23 m	0.28 m
Plasma current I_{p} (max)	360 kA	2 MA
Magnetic field B_{T}	0.9 T - 2.1 T	5 T
Vacuum pressure	1×10^{−6} Pa	
Elongation	1.8	
Plasma shape	D, SND, elliptical, circular	
Pulse length(max)	~ 0.5 s	5 s
Beam heating P_{NBI} 40 keV	2 × 0.3 MW	4-5 MW

== See also ==
- List of fusion experiments
- ELM (Edge Localized Mode)
- Ball-pen probe
- Langmuir probe
- Thomson scattering
- Resonant magnetic perturbations
