= Compass (Hudson) =

Public artwork by Jon Barlow Hudson

- Artist: Jon Barlow Hudson
- Year: 2005
- Type: Public Art Sculpture
- Dimensions: 370 cm × 300 cm × 91 cm (144 in × 120 in × 36 in)
- Location: Milwaukee, Wisconsin; 43°3′7.354″N 87°53′25.134″W
- Owner: Milwaukee County Department of Parks, Recreation and Culture

Compass is a public artwork by American artist Jon Barlow Hudson, located above the Brady Street Pedestrian Bridge, in Milwaukee, Wisconsin.

== Description ==
Compass consists of mirror-polished stainless steel tubes and four different blocks of Wisconsin granite. The sculpture measures 12'h. x 10'w. x 3'd. and was installed and signed by Hudson in 2005. This abstract/geometric sculpture connects four Wisconsin granite blocks with stainless steel tubes to form the shape of a circle or "compass" (one block at north, east, south, and west points). The sculpture includes Wausau Ruby Red, Glacial Rose, Amberg Silver Grey and Mellen Black Gabbro granite. The sculpture sits along the bike-path at the edge of the cliff above Brady St. Bridge, overlooking Lincoln Boulevard in Milwaukee, Wisconsin.

== Historical information ==
=== Location history ===
Compass was commissioned through a national competition of the County of Milwaukee for the new Pedestrian Brady Street Bridge. It is one part of the commission; Hudson also created Sentinels nestled within the circle of the ramp descending from the bridge. A poem written by Hudson's mother, poet Jean Barlow Hudson is engraved at the base of the sculpture. Hudson claims the poem was a premonition for this sculpture, although it was written "in the 40s before I was born." The poem reads as follows:

"Inner time is limitless –
from past lives
I can no longer remember,
only feel.
Time flows,
and around me a continuum
moves and swirls,
engulfing me,
and moves majestically
beyond
my inner sight or imagination.
This time is immense,
a celestial sphere
yet it does not forget me,
does not neglect me.
It embraces me.
I am part of its verity.
It is a part of mine.
My life flows. It flows."

Compass is also based on a local Lakota Sioux Native-American story of discovering the four points of a compass. In the story, a bird leads the narrator to four boulders, symbolizing different directions. Hudson includes a depiction of this bird in his northern stone; he uses the copper cutout bird from the Mound City Hopewell Indians of Ohio as a guide. The stainless steel tubes were polished to a mirror-like quality for multiple reasons: "to incorporate the color and atmosphere of the environment into the work, reflect the movement of passers-by, and to make the stones float, like my Father did with my Mother in their floating ring trick back in the 40s in Wyoming when he was a professional magician named Bendu."

In addition to these references, Hudson also incorporates the Chinese jade disc "bi" or "pi" – the symbol for unity, peace, wholeness and heaven.

=== Acquisition ===
The Milwaukee Percent for Art Program commissioned both Sentinels and Compass for the Brady Street Pedestrian Bridge. The sculpture was administered by the Milwaukee County Department of Parks, Recreation, and Culture through a national competition in 2005.

== Artist ==
Jon Barlow Hudson was born in Montana in 1945 and has spent much of his life traveling the United States as well as overseas. His father was a hydro-geologist, writer, professional magician, builder, and a violinist. Hudson's mother was a weaver, writer, teacher, and public activist (she would become Yellow Springs, Ohio's first female mayor in later years). When Jon was six years old, their family traveled to Saudi Arabia, and through the foreign traveling, Hudson was able to explore many great historical-sculptural sites. He worked at several apprenticeships and gained knowledge from life experience, but also attained his Bachelor of Fine Arts and Master of Fine Arts degrees from the California Institute of the Arts. Hudson prefers to work with stone, steel (painted or raw/polished), glass, light, water, and other natural materials. Jon Barlow creates large and small scale public and private sculptures, installations, and corporate sculptures. Hudson has displayed sculptures in over 23 countries and enjoys working with the space to either reflect or transform the surroundings, according to the criteria for each site-specific sculpture.

== See also ==
- The Lynden Sculpture Garden, located just outside Milwaukee
- Another public artwork by Jon Barlow Hudson, Sentinels
