= ISTTOK =

Research fusion reactor of the Instituto Superior Técnico, Lisbon, Portugal

The ISTTOK Tokamak ("Instituto Superior Técnico TOKamak") is a research fusion reactor (tokamak) of the Instituto Superior Técnico. It has a circular cross-section due to a poloidal graphite limiter and an iron core transformer. Its particularity is that it is one of the few tokamaks operating in AC (alternating plasma current) regime, as well in DC regime. In 2013, the AC operation allowed the standard discharges to extend from 35 ms to more than 1s.

== Characteristics ==
- Minor radius: 0.085 metre
- Major radius: 0.46 metre
- Plasma current: ~4kA kiloAmperes
- Plasma life span: 30/1000 milliseconds (DC/AC)
- Maximum toroidal magnetic field: 2.8 tesla
- Nominal toroidal magnetic field: 0.3-0.6 tesla

== See also ==
- Small Tight Aspect Ratio Tokamak
- Ball-pen probe
