= Compass (1965 TV program) =

- Genre: Current affairs; documentary
- Country of origin: Canada
- Original language: English
- No. of seasons: 2
- No. of episodes: 15

Production
- Executive producers: John Kennedy (1965); Jim Carney (1966)
- Running time: 30 minutes

Original release
- Network: CBC Television
- Release: 11 July 1965 – 21 August 1966

Compass is a Canadian documentary and current affairs television program that aired on CBC Television from 1965 to 1966.

== Premise ==
This program featured documentaries by emerging producers, many of whom contributed to This Hour Has Seven Days. Aired between regular television seasons, Compass was often experimental in its approach. Like This Hour Has Seven Days, Compass was broadcast on Sunday nights.

Participating producers during the program included Alex Brown, Beryl Fox, Sam Levene, Ross McLean, Brian O'Leary, Peter Pearson, David Ruskin, Glenn Sarty, Patrick Watson, and Larry Zolf.

== Scheduling ==
This half-hour program was broadcast on Sundays at 10:00 p.m. (Eastern time) from 11 July to 12 September 1965 in the first year, and 3 July to 21 August 1966 in the second.

=== 1965 season ===
| Date | Topic |
|---|---|
| 11 July 1965 | The debut featured the subject of racial differences. The first part featured a racially diverse adoptive family in Toronto. The second part featured a play about a society in which white people live in a majority black society, written by Rev. Malcolm Boyd. This episode was produced by Brian O'Leary. |
| 18 July 1965 | A feature on the United Nations' International Co-Operation Year |
| 25 July 1965 | "Judaism: A Tradition in Transition" This episode concerns the modern presence of Judaism in society and the prospects for its future survival, from producer Sam Levene and host Warren Davis. |
| 1 August 1965 | Peter Pearson, producer and director of this episode, interviews actor Marcello Mastroianni. Dinah Christie and Warren Davis provided an introduction to the episode and to excerpts from Mastroianni's films. |
| 8 August 1965 | This episode features an interview with Rev. Daniel Egan, New York City's "Junkie Priest", produced by Beryl Fox. This is followed by an interview with the World Peace Council's Verdun Perl who discusses the situation in Vietnam following her visit to North Vietnam. |
| 15 August 1965 | "Singin' Man": Leon Bibb sings "Come All Ye Fair Young Maidens", "Joey", "Five Hundred Miles" and "The Honeywind Blow and Rocks (a chain gang melody)" with assistance from guitarist, arranger and musical director Stuart Scharf. Bibb also provided commentary about his musical experiences between songs. Episode producer Jim Carney featured Bibb on a basic set with few props and no special production techniques, stating that he wanted to portray Bibb "in as direct, uncluttered and forceful a way as possible." |
| 22 August 1965 | "Four Faces of Ballet" from producer Tom Koch features interviews with ballet performers Erik Bruhn, Rudolf Nureyev, Lynn Seymour and Lois Smith. |
| 29 August 1965 | (pre-empted for a special on the Couchiching Conference) |
| 5 September 1965 | "Interstellar Communication" features New York Times science editor Walter Sullivan in a discussion of whether sentient extraterrestrial life exists. Jim Carney was the episode's producer. |
| 12 September 1965 | "The Way Things Are", listed in the CBC Times as "The New Students": This episode features radical student initiatives for social needs, particularly in working with the poor. Representatives of the Student Union for Peace Action at the University of Toronto and Queen's University discuss their work. Various student summer projects are featured including a summer camp for children in poverty situated north of Toronto. |

=== 1966 season ===
| Date | Topic |
|---|---|
| 3 July 1966 | "A Sign Of The Times": features The Second City members from Chicago and Toronto who present their satire on subjects during 1966. Performers include Barrie Baldaro, Dave Broadfoot, Jack Burns, Dinah Christie, John Clark, Stan Daniels, Bob Dishy, Eric House, Pam Hyatt, Harvey Jason, Avery Schreiber, Paul Soles and Jean Templeton. David Ruskin was the episode's director and Ross McLean was its producer. |
| 10 July 1966 | Judge J.H. Sissons, a circuit judge who covers Canada's Northern territories, is featured in this Charles Oberdorf production. |
| 17 July 1966 | "Agoraphobia": Vancouver's Psychedelic Club is profiled by producers Jim Carney and David Ruskin. |
| 24 July 1966 | Patrick Watson interviews Norman Podhoretz of Commentary regarding contemporary American policies and problems. Producer was Alex Brown. |
| 31 July 1966 | (pre-empted for "All's Right", a special documentary by Warner Troyer) |
| 7 August 1966 | (pre-empted for a special on the Couchiching Conference) |
| 14 August 1966 | "That British Fact", featuring George Grant and concerning subjects related to his 1965 essay Lament for a Nation: The Defeat of Canadian Nationalism. David Ruskin produced this episode, Larry Zolf is its director. Lister Sinclair was the narrator. |
| 21 August 1966 | "The Ecstacy is Sometimes Fantastic", produced by Glenn Sarty, featured Toronto rock groups The Checkmates and Jon and Dee. |
