= Project Compass =

UK charity

Project Compass is a UK charity which was set up in 2003. It was first run as a 12-month pilot project, based in London: this provided a template work across the United Kingdom. The pilot project was funded by contributions from the defence industry (£40,000), and the ODPM Homelessness Directorate (£23,500). The charity is notable as the only charity working in the area of homelessness among ex service personnel, and also for its Royal patronage.

It seeks to help ex-Service personnel who are (or are at risk of becoming) homeless to find work, and hence rebuild their lives. It provides personal development courses and career training to improve self-esteem and increase employability.

The project was established by the UK Ministry of Defence, KPMG, The Royal British Legion and Business in the Community. In late 2003 the BBC reported that the project was based on an idea thought up by the Prince Charles and the Ex-Services Action Group.

The project has been supported by Prince Charles, who said in 2006 that up to a quarter of people sleeping rough on London streets had served in the forces and that Project Compass was helping to “break the cycle” for those who had struggled to adjust.
