= Compass (Simpson) =

Public art work by Gail Simpson

- Artist: Gail Simpson
- Year: 2003
- Type: painted aluminum
- Dimensions: 670 cm (264 in)
- Location: East North Avenue and North Cambridge Ave., Milwaukee, Wisconsin; 43°3′36.748″N 87°53′31.75″W
- Owner: Eastside BID #20

Compass is a public art work by American artist Gail Simpson, located on the east side of Milwaukee, Wisconsin. The painted aluminum sculpture was commissioned by the Eastside Business Improvement District #20 to serve as a gateway for pedestrians and vehicular traffic entering the North Avenue commercial zone. A tall stainless steel light post salvaged from the demolition of Milwaukee's Park East Freeway is surrounded by a colorful array of painted aluminum signs that protrude in a spiral formation. Each sign has a distinctive shape and word cut out in a unique typeface intended to reflect the history and character of the neighborhood. The artwork is located in the traffic median on the east side of the North Avenue Bridge. Milwaukee Journal Sentinel architecture critic Whitney Gould called the project, "part sculpture, part signpost."
