= Ball-pen probe =

Diagnostic probe measuring plasma potential in magnetized plasmas

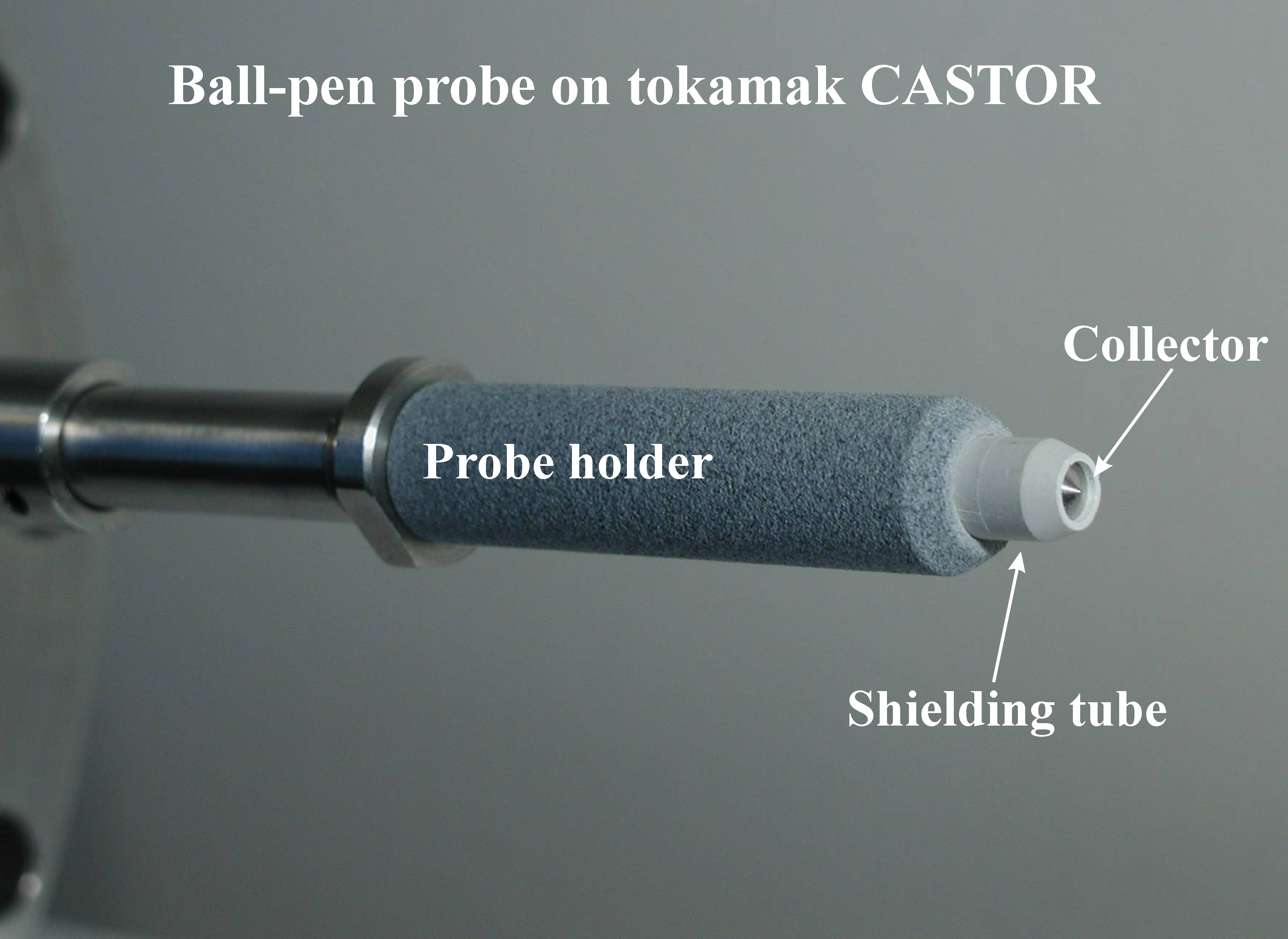
Ball-pen probe used on tokamak CASTOR in 2004. A stainless steel collector moves inside a ceramic (boron nitride) shielding tube.

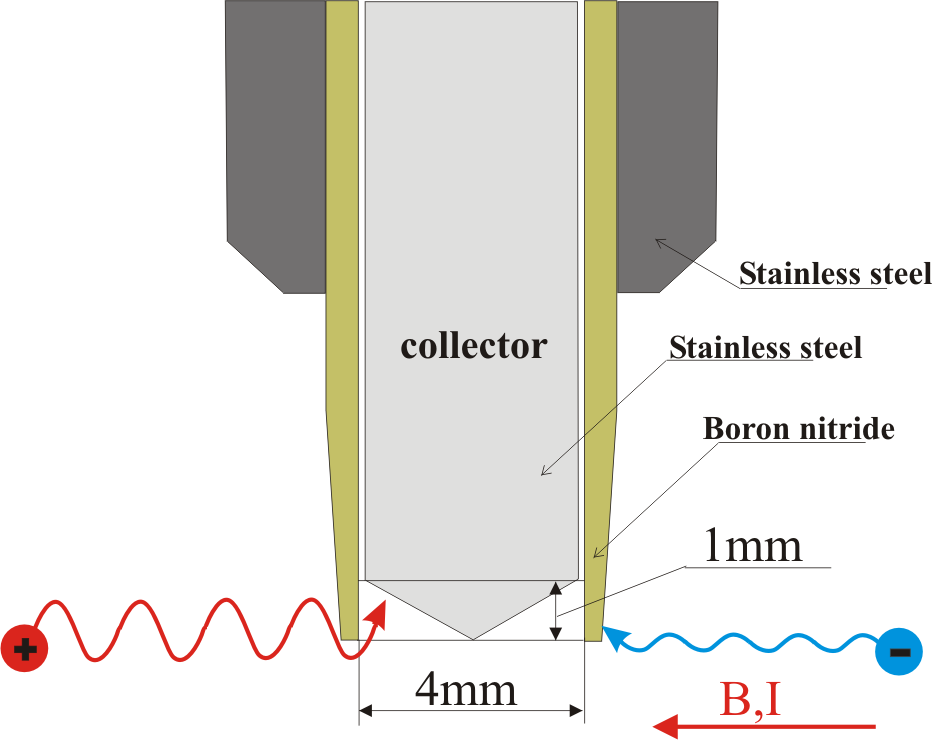
Schematic picture of a single ball-pen probe. Ions (in red) have a large gyromagnetic radius and can reach the collector more easily than electrons (in blue).

A ball-pen probe is a modified Langmuir probe used to measure the plasma potential in magnetized plasmas. The ball-pen probe balances the electron and ion saturation currents, so that its floating potential is equal to the plasma potential. Because electrons have a much smaller gyroradius than ions, a moving ceramic shield can be used to screen off an adjustable part of the electron current from the probe collector.

Ball-pen probes are used in plasma physics, notably in tokamaks such as CASTOR, ASDEX Upgrade, COMPASS, ISTTOK, MAST, TJ-K, RFX, H-1 Heliac, IR-T1, GOLEM and stellarator Wendelstein 7-X as well as low temperature devices as DC cylindrical magnetron in Prague and linear magnetized plasma devices in Nancy and Ljubljana.

== Principle ==
If a Langmuir probe (electrode) is inserted into a plasma, its potential is not equal to the plasma potential $\Phi$ because a Debye sheath forms, but instead to a floating potential $V_{fl}$. The difference with the plasma potential is given by the electron temperature $T_e$:

$\Phi - V_{fl} = \alpha T_e$

where the coefficient $\alpha$ is given by the ratio of the electron and ion saturation currents ($I^{sat}_e$ and $I^{sat}_i$) expressed by electron and ion current density ($j^{sat}_e$ and $j^{sat}_i$) and proportional collecting areas ($A_e$ and $A_i$):

$\alpha =\ln\left(\frac{I^{sat}_e}{I^{sat}_i}\right) = \ln\left(\frac{A_e j^{sat}_e}{A_i j^{sat}_i}\right) = \ln(R)$

The ball-pen probe modifies the collecting areas for electrons and ions in such a way that the ratio $R$ is equal to one. Consequently, $\alpha = 0$ and the floating potential of the ball-pen probe becomes equal to the plasma potential regardless of the electron temperature:

$V_{fl} = \Phi$

== Design and calibration ==
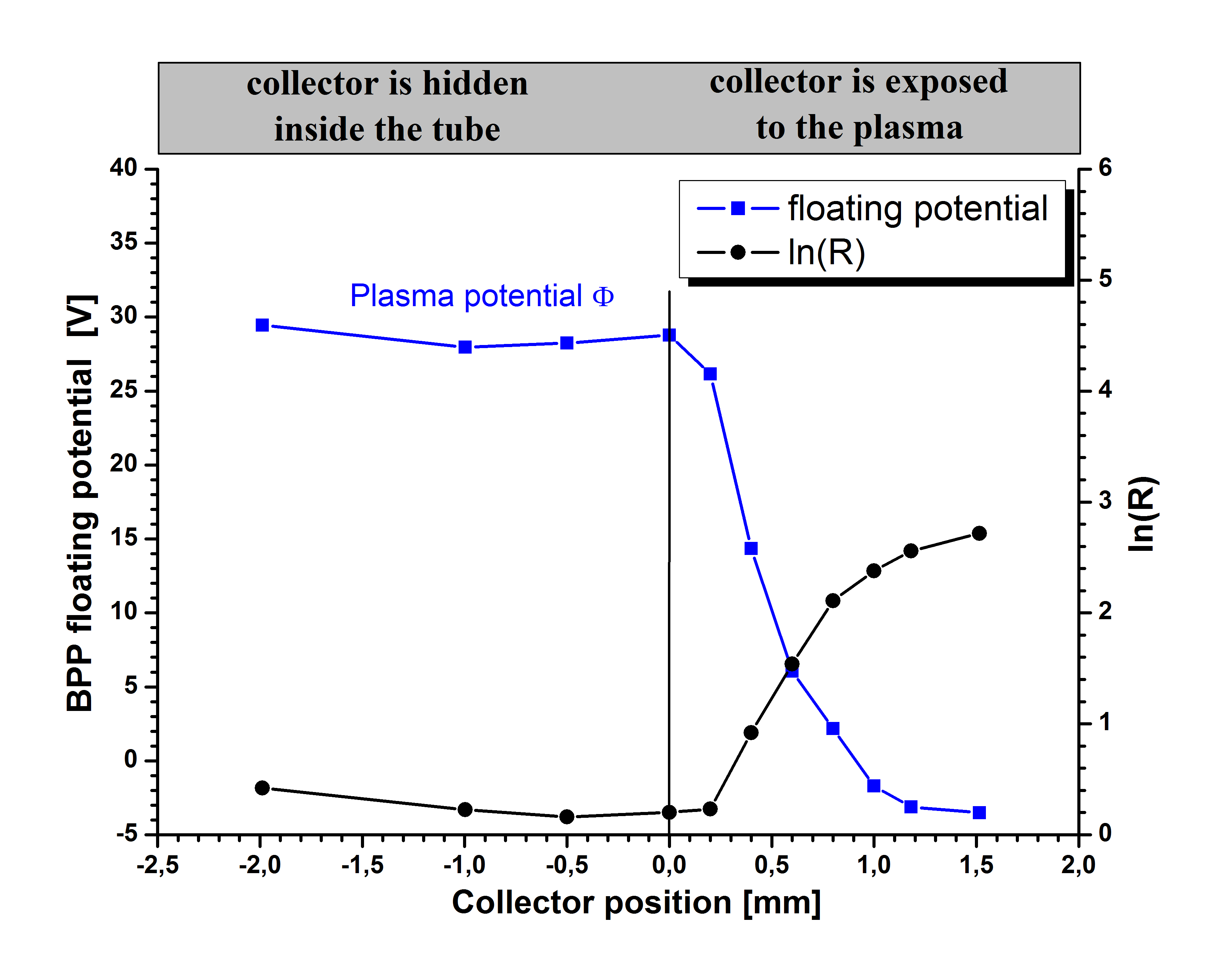
Potential and ln(R) of the ball-pen probe for different positions of the collector

A ball-pen probe consists of a conically shaped collector (non-magnetic stainless steel, tungsten, copper, molybdenum), which is shielded by an insulating tube (boron nitride, Alumina). The collector is fully shielded and the whole probe head is placed perpendicular to magnetic field lines.

When the collector slides within the shield, the ratio $R$ varies, and can be set to 1. The adequate retraction length strongly depends on the magnetic field's value. The collector retraction should be roughly below the ion's Larmor radius. Calibrating the proper position of the collector can be done in two different ways:

1. The ball-pen probe collector is biased by a low-frequency voltage that provides the I-V characteristics and obtain the saturation current of electrons and ions. The collector is then retracted until the I-V characteristics becomes symmetric. In this case, the ratio $R$ is close to unity, though not exactly. If the probe is retracted deeper, the I-V characteristics remain symmetric.
2. The ball-pen probe collector potential is left floating, and the collector is retracted until its potential saturates. The resulting potential is above the Langmuir probe potential.

== Electron temperature measurements ==
Using two measurements of the plasma potential with probes whose coefficient $\alpha$ differ, it is possible to retrieve the electron temperature passively (without any input voltage or current). Using a Langmuir probe (with a non-negligible) and a ball-point probe (whose associated $R$ is close to zero) the electron temperature is given by:

$T_e = \frac{\Phi-V_{fl}}{\alpha}$

where $\Phi$ is measured by the ball-pen probe, $V_{fl}$ by the standard Langmuir probe, and $\alpha$ is given by the Langmuir probe geometry, plasma gas composition, the magnetic field, and other minor factors (secondary electron emission, sheath expansion, etc.). It can be calculated theoretically, its value being about 3 for a non-magnetized hydrogen plasma.

In practice, the ratio $R$ for the ball-pen probe is not exactly equal to one, so that the coefficient $\alpha$ must be corrected by an empirical value for $R$:

$T_e = \frac{\Phi_{BPP}-V_{fl}}{\bar{\alpha}},$

where $\bar{\alpha}=\alpha - ln(R).$

== Ion temperature measurements ==
Example of the electron branch of the ball-pen probe I-V characteristic with fast sweeping frequency f = 50 kHz as measured on the tokamak COMPASS using data acquisition system with 5 MHz sampling frequency

The ion temperature $T_i$ is an important quantity in fusion plasmas; however, it is only rarely measured using electrical probes. The ball-pen probe can be used to determine this quantity by fitting its current–voltage characteristics. The method is relatively simple, but requires a source of sweeping voltage. The ion temperature is obtained from the exponential part of the electron branch ($V_{probe} > \Phi$) of the current–voltage characteristic, as described below:

$I(V_{probe}) = I_{i}^{sat} \left[ R \left(1 + K (V_{probe} - \Phi) \right) - \exp\left(\frac{\Phi - V_{probe}}{T_i}\right) \right]$

where $I_{i}^{sat}$ denotes the ion saturation current ($A_i j_{i}^{sat}$), and the coefficient $K$ represents a generally observed linear increase with $K > 0$ electron current ($K = 0$ for fully saturated case), combined with an exponential dependence describing the ion current, which is governed by the ion temperature $T_i$.

The main advantages of this method include:

- Robust and local measurements, making it suitable for both small and large fusion devices (COMPASS, Wendelstein 7-X)
- A relatively high level of the effective probe signal ($I_{i}^{sat}$), which enables the use of a fast voltage sweeping regime and allows high temporal resolution (on the order of $5\text{–}10\,\mu\text{s}$).
