= Plasma parameters =

Characteristic values of a plasma

Plasma parameters define various characteristics of a plasma, an electrically conductive collection of charged and neutral particles of various species (electrons and ions) that responds collectively to electromagnetic forces. Such particle systems can be studied statistically, i.e., their behaviour can be described based on a limited number of global parameters instead of tracking each particle separately.

== Fundamental ==
The fundamental plasma parameters in a steady state are

- the number density $n_s$ of each particle species $s$ present in the plasma,
- the temperature $T_s$ of each species,
- the mass $m_s$ of each species,
- the charge $q_s$ of each species,
- and the magnetic flux density $B$.

Using these parameters and physical constants, other plasma parameters can be derived.

== Other ==
All quantities are in Gaussian (cgs) units except energy $E$ and temperature $T$ which are in electronvolts. For the sake of simplicity, a single ionic species is assumed. The ion mass is expressed in units of the proton mass, $\mu = m_i/m_p$ and the ion charge in units of the elementary charge $e$, $Z = q_i/e$ (in the case of a fully ionized atom, $Z$ equals to the respective atomic number). The other physical quantities used are the Boltzmann constant ($k_\text{B}$), speed of light ($c$), and the Coulomb logarithm ($\ln\Lambda$).

=== Frequencies ===
- electron gyrofrequency, the angular frequency of the circular motion of an electron in the plane perpendicular to the magnetic field:
  $$\omega_{ce} = \frac{eB}{m_e c} \approx 1.76 \times 10^{7}\,B\ \mbox{rad/s}$$
- ion gyrofrequency, the angular frequency of the circular motion of an ion in the plane perpendicular to the magnetic field:
  $$\omega_{ci} = \frac{ZeB}{m_i c} \approx 9.58 \times 10^3\,\frac{ZB}{\mu}\ \mbox{rad/s}$$
- electron plasma frequency, the frequency with which electrons oscillate (plasma oscillation):
  $$\omega_{pe} = \left(\frac{4 \pi n_e e^2}{m_e}\right)^\frac{1}{2} \approx 5.64 \times 10^4\,{n_e}^\frac{1}{2} \ \mbox{rad/s}$$
- ion plasma frequency:
  $$\omega_{pi} = \left(\frac{4\pi n_i Z^2 e^2}{m_i}\right)^\frac{1}{2} \approx {1.32 \times 10^3} \,Z \left(\frac{n_i}{\mu}\right)^\frac{1}{2}\ \mbox{rad/s}$$
- electron trapping rate:
  $$\nu_{Te} = \left(\frac{e E}{m_e}\right)^\frac{1}{2} \approx 7.26 \times 10^8\,E^\frac{1}{2}\ \mathrm{s^{-1}}$$
- ion trapping rate:
  $$\nu_{Ti} = \left(\frac{Z e E}{m_i}\right)^\frac{1}{2} \approx {1.69 \times 10^7}\,\left(\frac{Z E}{\mu}\right)^\frac{1}{2}\ \mathrm{s^{-1}}$$
- electron collision rate in completely ionized plasmas:
  $$\nu_e \approx 2.91 \times 10^{-6}\,\frac{n_e\ln\Lambda}{T_e^\frac{3}{2}}\ \mathrm{s^{-1}}$$
- ion collision rate in completely ionized plasmas:
  $$\nu_i \approx 4.80 \times 10^{-8}\,\frac{Z^4 n_i\,\ln\Lambda}{\left(T_i^3 \mu\right)^\frac{1}{2}} \ \mathrm{s^{-1}}$$

=== Lengths ===
- electron thermal de Broglie wavelength, approximate average de Broglie wavelength of electrons in a plasma:
  $$\lambda_{\mathrm{th},e} = \sqrt{\frac{h^2}{2\pi m_e k_\text{B} T_e}} \approx 6.919 \times 10^{-8}\,\frac{1}{{T_e}^\frac{1}{2}}\ \mbox{cm}$$
- classical distance of closest approach, also known as "Landau length" the closest that two particles with the elementary charge come to each other if they approach head-on and each has a velocity typical of the temperature, ignoring quantum-mechanical effects:
  $$\frac{e^2}{k_\text{B} T} \approx 1.44 \times 10^{-7}\,\frac{1}{T}\ \mbox{cm}$$
- electron gyroradius, the radius of the circular motion of an electron in the plane perpendicular to the magnetic field:
  $$r_e = \frac{v_{Te}}{\omega_{ce}} \approx 2.38\,\frac{{T_e}^\frac{1}{2}}{B}\ \mbox{cm}$$
- ion gyroradius, the radius of the circular motion of an ion in the plane perpendicular to the magnetic field:
  $$r_i = \frac{v_{Ti}}{\omega_{ci}} \approx 1.02 \times 10^2\,\frac{\left(\mu T_i\right)^\frac{1}{2}}{ZB}\ \mbox{cm}$$
- plasma skin depth (also called the electron inertial length), the depth in a plasma to which electromagnetic radiation can penetrate:
  $$\frac{c}{\omega_{pe}} \approx 5.31 \times 10^5\,\frac{1}{{n_e}^\frac{1}{2}}\ \mbox{cm}$$
- Debye length, the scale over which electric fields are screened out by a redistribution of the electrons:
  $$\lambda_D = \left(\frac{k_\text{B} T_e}{4\pi ne^2}\right)^\frac{1}{2} = \frac{v_{Te}}{\omega_{pe}} \approx 7.43 \times 10^2\,\left(\frac{T_e}{n}\right)^\frac{1}{2}\ \mbox{cm}$$
- ion inertial length, the scale at which ions decouple from electrons and the magnetic field becomes frozen into the electron fluid rather than the bulk plasma:
  $$d_i = \frac{c}{\omega_{pi}} \approx 2.28 \times 10^7\, \frac{1}{Z} \left(\frac{\mu}{n_i}\right)^\frac{1}{2}\ \mbox{cm}$$
- mean free path, the average distance between two subsequent collisions of the electron (ion) with plasma components:
  $$\lambda_{e,i} = \frac{\overline{v_{e,i}}}{\nu_{e,i}},$$
  where $\overline{v_{e,i}}$ is an average velocity of the electron (ion) and $\nu_{e,i}$ is the electron or ion collision rate.

=== Velocities ===
- electron thermal velocity, typical velocity of an electron in a Maxwell–Boltzmann distribution:
  $$v_\text{th,e} = \left(\frac{k_\text{B} T_e}{m_e}\right)^\frac{1}{2} \approx 4.19 \times 10^7\,{T_e}^\frac{1}{2} \ \mbox{cm/s}$$
- ion thermal velocity, typical velocity of an ion in a Maxwell–Boltzmann distribution:
  $$v_\text{th,i} = \left(\frac{k_\text{B} T_i}{m_i}\right)^\frac{1}{2} \approx 9.79 \times 10^5\,\left(\frac{T_i}{\mu}\right)^\frac{1}{2}\ \mbox{cm/s}$$
- ion speed of sound, the speed of the longitudinal waves resulting from the mass of the ions and the pressure of the electrons:
  $$c_s = \left(\frac{\gamma Z k_\text{B} T_e}{m_i}\right)^\frac{1}{2} \approx 9.79 \times 10^5\,\left(\frac{\gamma Z T_e}{\mu}\right)^\frac{1}{2}\ \mbox{cm/s},$$
  where $\gamma$ is the adiabatic index
- Alfvén velocity, the speed of the waves resulting from the mass of the ions and the restoring force of the magnetic field:
  $v_A = \frac{B}{\left(4\pi n_i m_i\right)^\frac{1}{2}} \approx 2.18 \times 10^{11}\,\frac{B}{\left(\mu n_i\right)^\frac{1}{2}}\ \mbox{cm/s}$ in cgs units,
  $v_A = \frac{B}{\left(\mu_0 n_i m_i\right)^\frac{1}{2}}$ in SI units.

=== Dimensionless ===
- number of particles in a Debye sphere
  $$\frac{4\pi}{3} n\lambda_\text{D}^3 \approx 1.72 \times 10^9 \, \left(\frac{T^3}{n}\right)^\frac{1}{2}$$
- Alfvén speed to speed of light ratio
  $$\frac{v_A}{c} \approx 7.28\,\frac{B}{\left(\mu n_i\right)^\frac{1}{2}}$$
- electron plasma frequency to gyrofrequency ratio
  $$\frac{\omega_{pe}}{\omega_{ce}} \approx 3.21 \times 10^{-3}\,\frac{{n_e}^\frac{1}{2}}{B}$$
- ion plasma frequency to gyrofrequency ratio
  $$\frac{\omega_{pi}}{\omega_{ci}} \approx 0.137\,\frac{\left(\mu n_i\right)^\frac{1}{2}}{B}$$
- thermal pressure to magnetic pressure ratio, or beta, β
  $$\beta = \frac{8\pi n k_\text{B} T}{B^2} \approx 4.03 \times 10^{-11}\,\frac{nT}{B^2}$$
- magnetic field energy to ion rest energy ratio
  $$\frac{B^2}{8\pi n_i m_i c^2} \approx 26.5\,\frac{B^2}{\mu n_i}$$

== Collisionality ==
In the study of tokamaks, collisionality is a dimensionless parameter which expresses the ratio of the electron-ion collision frequency to the banana orbit frequency.

The plasma collisionality $\nu^*$ is defined as
$$\nu^* = \nu_\mathrm{ei} \, \sqrt{\frac{m_\mathrm{e}}{k_\mathrm{B} T_\mathrm{e}}} \, \varepsilon^{-\frac{3}{2}} \, qR,$$
where $\nu_\mathrm{ei}$ denotes the electron-ion collision frequency, $R$ is the major radius of the plasma, $\varepsilon$ is the inverse aspect-ratio, and $q$ is the safety factor. The plasma parameters $m_\mathrm{i}$ and $T_\mathrm{i}$ denote, respectively, the mass and temperature of the ions, and $k_\mathrm{B}$ is the Boltzmann constant.

== Electron temperature ==
Temperature is a statistical quantity whose formal definition is
$$T = \left(\frac{\partial U}{\partial S}\right)_{V,N},$$
or the change in internal energy with respect to entropy, holding volume and particle number constant. A practical definition comes from the fact that the atoms, molecules, or whatever particles in a system have an average kinetic energy. The average means to average over the kinetic energy of all the particles in a system.

If the velocities of a group of electrons, e.g., in a plasma, follow a Maxwell–Boltzmann distribution, then the electron temperature is defined as the temperature of that distribution. For other distributions, not assumed to be in equilibrium or have a temperature, two-thirds of the average energy is often referred to as the temperature, since for a Maxwell–Boltzmann distribution with three degrees of freedom, $\langle E \rangle = \frac 3 2 \, k_\text{B} T$.

The SI unit of temperature is the kelvin (K), but using the above relation the electron temperature is often expressed in terms of the energy unit electronvolt (eV). Each kelvin (1 K) corresponds to 8.617333262...×10^{−5} eV; this factor is the ratio of the Boltzmann constant to the elementary charge. Each eV is equivalent to 11,605 kelvins, which can be calculated by the relation $\langle E \rangle = k_\text{B} T$.

The electron temperature of a plasma can be several orders of magnitude higher than the temperature of the neutral species or of the ions. This is a result of two facts. Firstly, many plasma sources heat the electrons more strongly than the ions. Secondly, atoms and ions are much heavier than electrons, and energy transfer in a two-body collision is much more efficient if the masses are similar. Therefore, equilibration of the temperature happens very slowly, and is not achieved during the time range of the observation.

== See also ==
- Ball-pen probe
- Langmuir probe
