= Tanya Compas =

British activist

Tanya Compas is a British youth worker and LGBT rights activist, working especially with queer Black young people in London.

== Life ==
Compas used to work as a caseworker for the Albert Kennedy Trust, where she worked with homeless young LGBT people.

In 2019, she became homeless after falling out with her family, due to Compas's sexuality. She explained that her "sexuality wasn’t a secret but the difference was when I brought my girlfriend to my family home to stay over; they couldn’t ignore the fact that I’m gay". She then had to spend Christmas alone, without her family, and decided that she would use her experiences working in the charity and social work sector to create events which would support other Black queer youth who are estranged from their families. In December 2019, she started the "Queer Black Christmas" event in London to do so, using a Crowdfunder to raise money for it, raising just over £7000.

During the national lockdown in the UK during the COVID-19 pandemic in June 2020, she decided to start raising money to set up the "Exist Loudly Fund", with which she intended to "support the needs of young people in the queer black community", with projects such as "monthly workshops, mentoring projects and fun activities, ... [and] physical supplies, like breast binders". Following the resurgence of Black Lives Matter protests in the UK, her Crowdfunder gained in popularity, raising £110,000 for this fund, which was enough for her to register it as a charity.

== Personal life ==
She came out when she was 23, and has a girlfriend. She is gay and genderfluid. However, in 2020, she Tweeted that she doesn't like using the word "identify" to refer to someone's gender or sexual identity, as it "makes it seem like its a choice". She also said "I don't identify as queer, I AM queer".

In 2018, Amnesty UK named her as "one of the UK’s most inspiring women", and the Evening Standard listed her on its Progress 1000 list of London's most influential people.
