= Jon Barlow Hudson =

American sculptor (born 1945)

Jon Barlow Hudson (born 1945 in Billings, Montana, United States) is an American sculptor.

== Life and work ==
Hudson was born in Montana and lived in Casper, Wyoming, for the first five years of his life. During the remainder of his childhood he lived in Yellow Springs, Ohio, as well as Saudi Arabia, Bolivia, Ecuador, Taiwan, and Jordan. He experimented with different art forms as a child and was very interested in photography as a teen. After graduation from Dreux American A.F.B. High School in France in 1963, he attended Urbana College, in Urbana, Ohio, where he began painting. This led him to transfer to the Dayton Art Institute from 1965 to 1967. Hudson switched to traveling for a year, going first to Senegal for six months working, with his father on a ground water project. He then traveled to study at the Kunstakademie in Stuttgart, Germany. After a motorcycle accident Hudson returned to the states and worked as assistant to NY/VT sculptor Charles Ginnever. After a year with Ginnever he attended the newly starting California Institute of the Arts, studying with Allan Kaprow, Paul Brach, Lloyd Hamroll, and Taiji with Marshall Ho'o: receiving his BFA in 1971 and MFA in 1972. Having had enough of city life, Hudson signed on to the Royal Drift Gold Mine, outside Magalia, CA, above Paradise, and built the mine working equipment for two years. Subsequently, the Dayton Art Institute, in Dayton, Ohio, awarded him his BFA in 1975. Hudson taught sculpture at university for several years, then focused on creating public sculptures since 1976. Since then his large-scale public sculptures have been installed in 27 countries around the world.

Hudson's first international commission was for two major large-scale stainless steel sculptures for the World Expo 88 in Brisbane, Australia. Hudson's sculpture PARADIGM, at 100 feet high in stainless steel, was the first in the world to be designed with the help of a computer, and the first to have a computerized lighting system installed. MORNING STAR II is reinstalled in the Brisbane Botanical Gardens. Hudson usually works with stone and stainless steel but has also worked with brass, copper, bronze, water, light, glass and more.

He is currently based in Yellow Springs, Ohio.

== Examples of artworks ==
- 2013 - FENESTRAE AETERNITATIS:BOOKS INTO INFINITY - White Rock Hills Public Library, Dallas, Texas
- 2012 - EIDOLON:ATOM - Chistye Prudy International Sculpture Park, Penza, Russia
- 2011 - SYNCHRONICITY XI:TSINGHUA - Tsinghua University, Beijing, China
- 2008 - WIND DRAGON - Beijing Chaoyang Olympic Park, China
- 2004 - TS'UNG TUBE:MEMORIAL TO 2 & 29TH.DIV. - St. Clair sur Elle, Cerisy la Foret Normandy, France
- 2001 - TS'UNG TUBES:MEMORIAL TO WTC 9/11, Escuela del Mármol de Fines Sculpture Park, Fines-Almería-Andalucía-Spain
- 1993 - FFENESTRAE AETERNITATIS:WINDOWS OVER THE DANUBE - Dunaferr Steel Sculpture Park, Dunaújváros, Hungary
- 1989 - SCRIVANIA II and TAVOLO GRIGIO - Wittenberg University, Chakeres Theatre, Springfield, Ohio
- 1988 - PARADIGM - World Expo 88, Brisbane, Queensland
- 1982 - RAVEN II - University of Nebraska–Lincoln Temple Theater, Lincoln, Nebraska
- 1976 - DJAMILA and MUSA - Boone National Bank, Columbia, Missouri

== Gallery ==
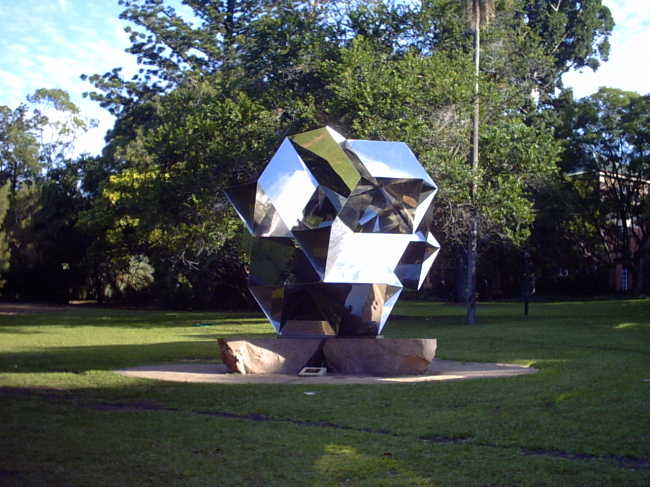
Brisbane
Morning star II, 1988

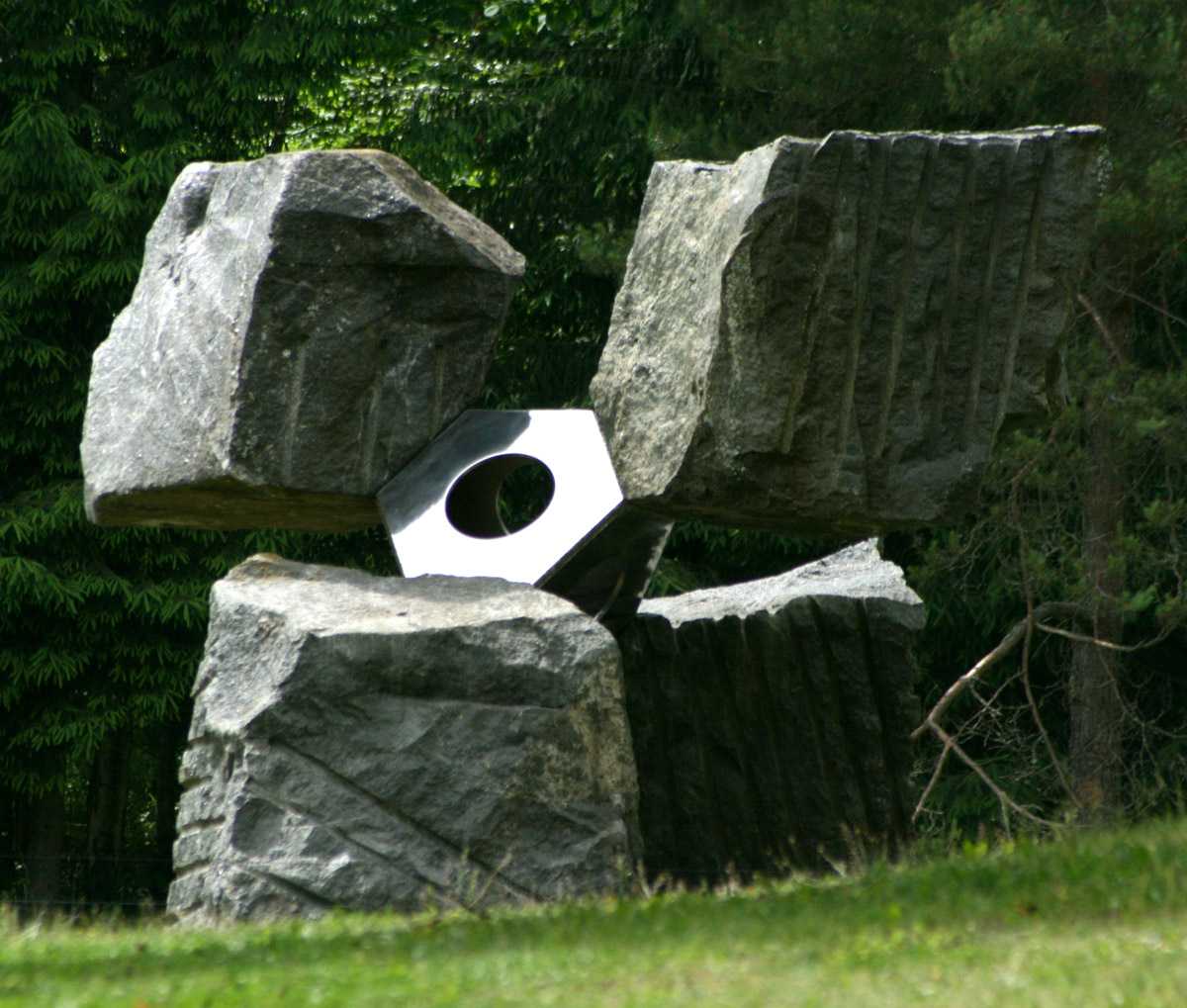
Vilniaus
Cloud hands, 1994

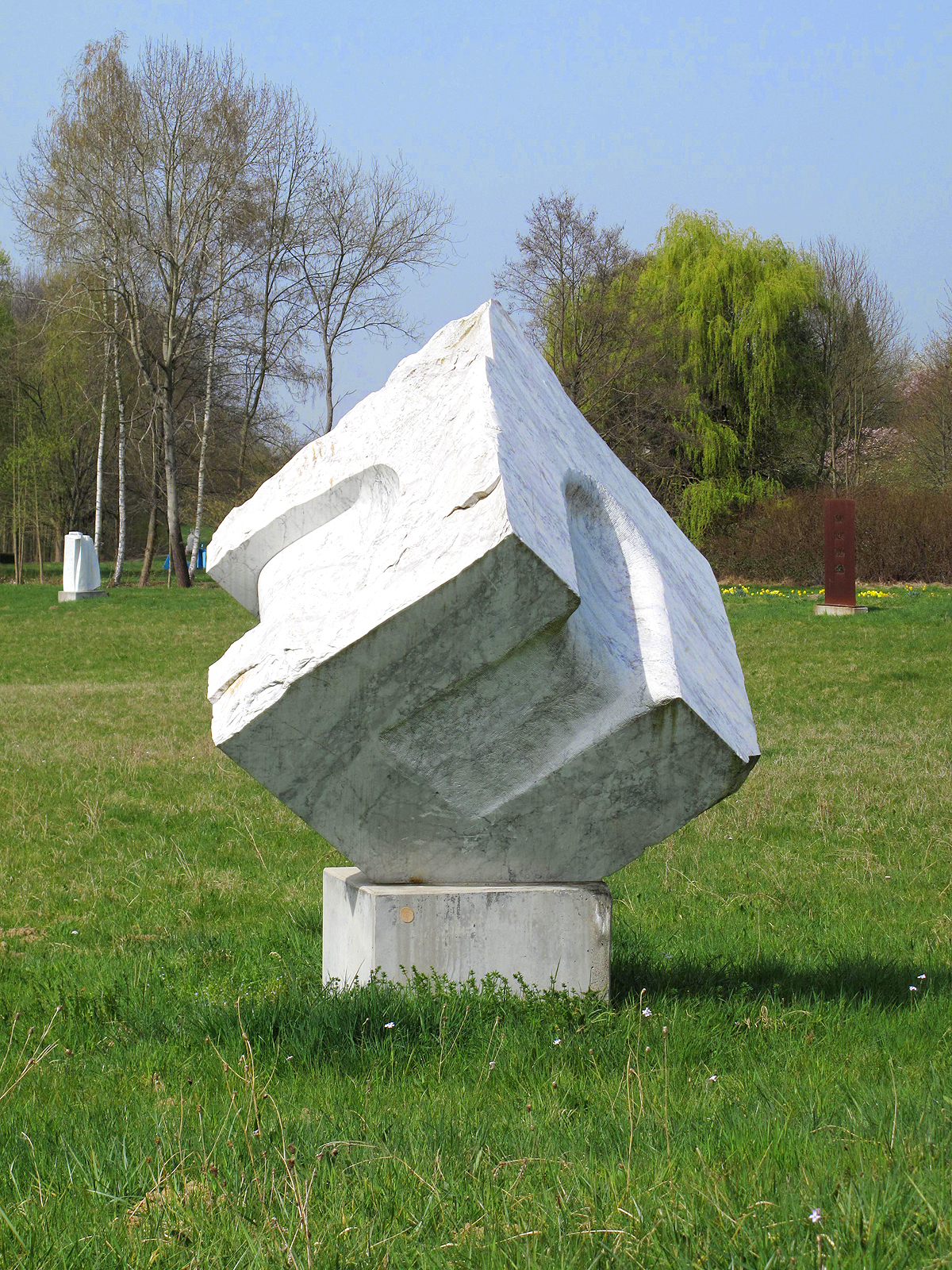
Durbach
Uncarved Block IX, 1999

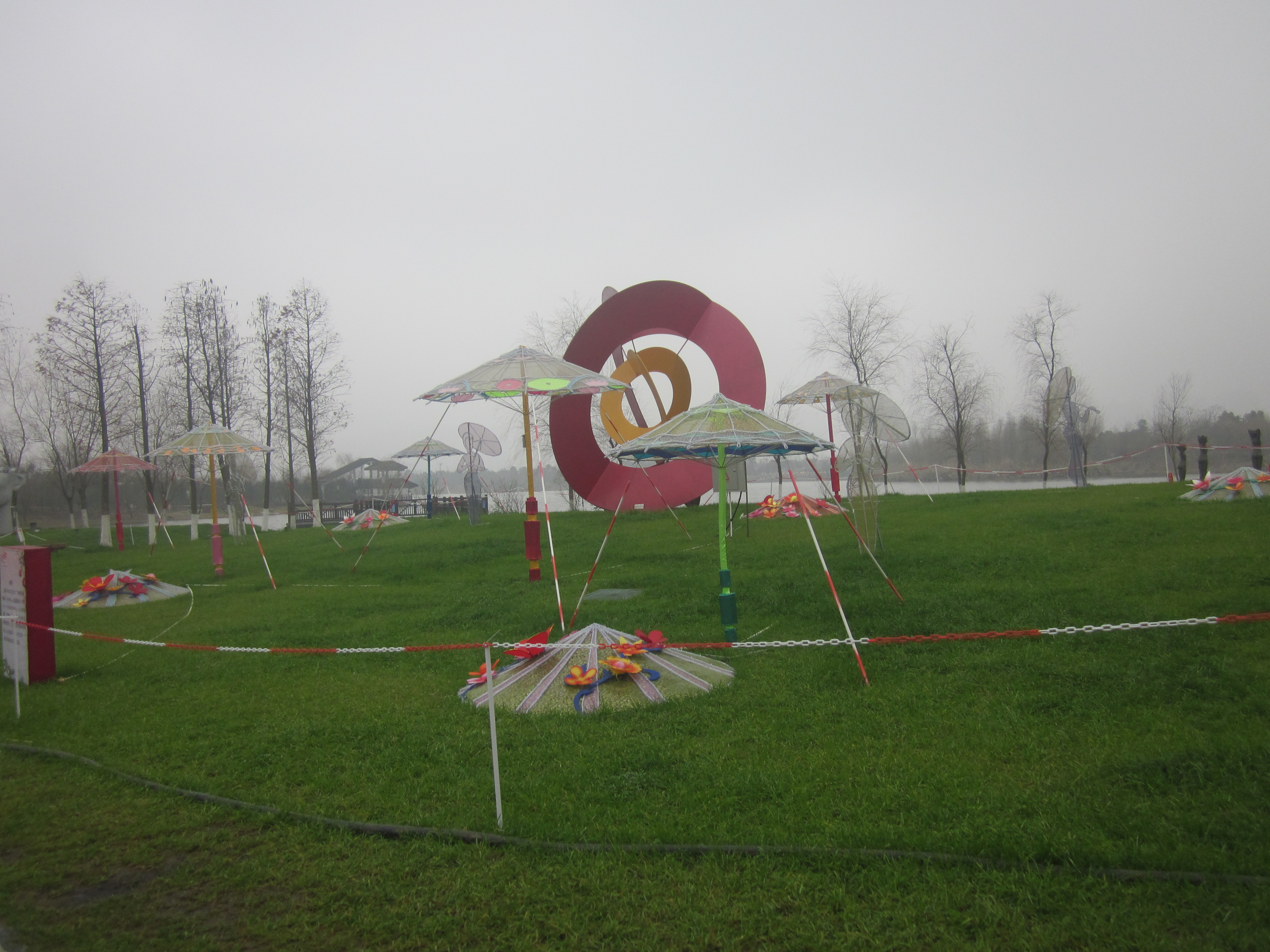
Changsha
Eidolon Pieta, 2015
