= Social Work (journal) =

- Discipline: Social work
- Language: English
- Edited by: Tricia Bent-Goodley

Publication details
- Former name(s): The Compass, Social Work Journal
- History: 1920-present
- Publisher: Oxford University Press on behalf of the National Association of Social Workers
- Frequency: Quarterly
- Impact factor: 1.145 (2015)

Standard abbreviations
- ISO 4: Soc. Work

Indexing
- ISSN: 0037-8046 (print); 1545-6846 (web)
- LCCN: a56001876
- OCLC no.: 1605893

Links
- Journal homepage; Online access; Online archive

Social Work is a quarterly peer-reviewed academic journal in the field of social work. It was established in 1920 as The Compass and was renamed Social Work Journal in 1948. It obtained its current name in 1956. It is published by Oxford University Press on behalf of the National Association of Social Workers, of which it is the official journal. The editor-in-chief is Tricia Bent-Goodley (Howard University). According to the Journal Citation Reports, the journal has a 2015 impact factor of 1.145.
