= Magnetohydrodynamic turbulence =

Turbulence that concerns the regimes of magnetofluid flow at high Reynolds number

Magnetohydrodynamic turbulence concerns the chaotic regimes of magnetofluid flow at high Reynolds number. Magnetohydrodynamics (MHD) deals with quasi-neutral fluids with very high conductivity, like plasmas. The fluid approximation implies that the focus is on macro length-and-time scales which are much larger than the collision length and collision time respectively. Understanding MHD turbulence is fundamental because most of the visible matter in the universe is in the plasma state and this plasma is mainly turbulent.

== Incompressible MHD equations ==
The incompressible MHD equations for constant mass density, $\rho_\text{m} = 1$, are

$$\begin{align}
\nabla \cdot \mathbf{u} & = 0, &
\frac{\partial \mathbf{u}}{\partial t} + \mathbf{u} \cdot \nabla \mathbf{u} & = -\nabla p + \mathbf{B} \cdot \nabla \mathbf{B} + \nu \nabla^2 \mathbf{u}, \\[8pt]
\nabla \cdot \mathbf{B} & = 0, &
\frac{\partial \mathbf{B}}{\partial t} + \mathbf{u} \cdot \nabla \mathbf{B} & = \mathbf{B} \cdot \nabla \mathbf{u} + \eta \nabla^2 \mathbf{B}. \\[5pt]
\end{align}$$

where

- u represents the velocity,
- B represent the magnetic field,
- p represents the total pressure (thermal+magnetic) fields,
- $\nu$ is the kinematic viscosity and
- $\eta$ represents magnetic diffusivity.

The third equation is the incompressibility condition. In the above equation, the magnetic field is in Alfvén units (same as velocity units). That is, $\mathbf{B}$ is normalized as $\mathbf{B}/\sqrt{\mu_0 \rho}$.

The total magnetic field can be split into two parts: $\mathbf{B} = \mathbf{B_0} + \mathbf{b}$ (mean + fluctuations).

The above equations in terms of Elsässer variables ($\mathbf{z}^{\pm} = \mathbf{u} \pm \mathbf{b}$) are

$$\frac{\partial \mathbf{z}^\pm}{\partial t} \mp \left(\mathbf{B}_0 \cdot \nabla\right) \mathbf z^\pm + \left(\mathbf z^\mp \cdot \nabla\right) \mathbf z^\pm = - \nabla p + \nu_+ \nabla^2 \mathbf{z}^\pm + \nu_- \nabla^2 \mathbf{z}^\mp$$

where $\nu_\pm = \frac{1}{2}(\nu \pm \eta)$. Nonlinear interactions occur between the Alfvénic fluctuations $z^{\mp}$.

The important nondimensional parameters for MHD are

- Reynolds number $Re = U L /\nu$
- Magnetic Reynolds number $Re_M = U L /\eta$
- Magnetic Prandtl number $P_M = \nu / \eta$.

The magnetic Prandtl number is an important property of the fluid. Liquid metals have small magnetic Prandtl numbers, for example, liquid sodium's $P_M$ is around $10^{-5}$. But plasmas have large $P_M$.

The Reynolds number is the ratio of the nonlinear term $\mathbf{u} \cdot \nabla \mathbf{u}$ of the Navier–Stokes equation to the viscous term. While the magnetic Reynolds number is the ratio of the nonlinear term and the diffusive term of the induction equation.

In many practical situations, the Reynolds number $Re$ of the flow is quite large. For such flows typically the velocity and the magnetic fields are random. Such flows are called to exhibit MHD turbulence. Note that $Re_M$ need not be large for MHD turbulence. $Re_M$ plays an important role in dynamo (magnetic field generation) problem.

The mean magnetic field plays an important role in MHD turbulence, for example it can make the turbulence anisotropic; suppress the turbulence by decreasing energy cascade etc. The earlier MHD turbulence models assumed isotropy of turbulence, while the later models have studied anisotropic aspects. More discussions on MHD turbulence can be found in Biskamp, Verma. and Galtier.

== Isotropic models ==
Iroshnikov and Kraichnan formulated the first phenomenological theory of MHD turbulence. They argued that in the presence of a strong mean magnetic field, $z^+$ and $z^-$ wavepackets travel in opposite directions with the phase velocity of $B_0$, and interact weakly. The relevant time scale is Alfvén time $(B_0 k)^{-1}$. As a results the energy spectra is

$$E^u(k) \approx E^b(k) \approx A (\Pi V_A)^{1/2} k^{-3/2}.$$	1

where $\Pi$ is the energy cascade rate.

Later Dobrowolny et al. derived the following generalized formulas for the cascade rates of $z^{\pm}$ variables:

$$\Pi^+ \approx \Pi^- \approx \tau^\pm_k E^+(k) E^-(k) k^4 \approx E^+(k) E^-(k) k^3 / B_0$$	2

where $\tau^\pm$ are the interaction time scales of $z^\pm$ variables.

Iroshnikov and Kraichnan's phenomenology follows once we choose $\tau^\pm \approx 1/(k V_A)$.

Marsch chose the nonlinear time scale $T_{NL}^{\pm} \approx (k z_k^{\mp})^{-1}$ as the interaction time scale for the eddies and derived Kolmogorov-like energy spectrum for the Elsasser variables:

$$E^\pm(k) = K^\pm (\Pi^\pm)^{4/3} (\Pi^\mp)^{-2/3} k^{-5/3}$$	3

where $\Pi^+$ and $\Pi^-$ are the energy cascade rates of $z^+$ and $z^-$ respectively, and $K^{\pm}$ are constants.

Matthaeus and Zhou attempted to combine the above two time scales by postulating the interaction time to be the harmonic mean of Alfven time and nonlinear time.

The main difference between the two competing phenomenologies (−3/2 and −5/3) is the chosen time scales for the interaction time. The main underlying assumption in that Iroshnikov and Kraichnan's phenomenology should work for strong mean magnetic field, whereas Marsh's phenomenology should work when the fluctuations dominate the mean magnetic field (strong turbulence).

However, as we will discuss below, the solar wind observations and numerical simulations tend to favour −5/3 energy spectrum even when the mean magnetic field is stronger compared to the fluctuations. This issue was resolved by Verma using renormalization group analysis by showing that the Alfvénic fluctuations are affected by scale-dependent "local mean magnetic field". The local mean magnetic field scales as $k^{-1/3}$, substitution of which in Dobrowolny's equation yields Kolmogorov's energy spectrum for MHD turbulence.

Renormalization group analysis have been also performed for computing the renormalized viscosity and resistivity. It was shown that these diffusive quantities scale as $k^{-4/3}$ that again yields $k^{-5/3}$ energy spectra consistent with Kolmogorov-like model for MHD turbulence. The above renormalization group calculation has been performed for both zero and nonzero cross helicity.

The above phenomenologies assume isotropic turbulence that is not the case in the presence of a mean magnetic field. The mean magnetic field typically suppresses the energy cascade along the direction of the mean magnetic field.

== Anisotropic models ==
A mean magnetic field makes turbulence anisotropic. In the limit $\delta z^{\pm} \ll B_0$, an analytical theory can be developed which asymptotically leads to a kinetic equation that describes the evolution of the energy spectrum over long timescales. This work was done by Galtier et al. who found the Kolmogorov-Zakharov spectrum

$$E(k) \sim (\Pi B_0)^{1/2} k_\parallel^{1/2} k_\perp^{-2}$$

where $k_\parallel$ and $k_{\perp}$ are components of the wavenumber parallel and perpendicular to the mean magnetic field. The above limit is called weak wave turbulence and the spectrum is an exact solution of MHD turbulence.

Under the strong turbulence limit, $\delta z^\pm \sim B_0$, Goldereich and Sridhar argue that $k_\perp z_{k_\perp} \sim k_\parallel B_0$ ("critical balanced state") which implies that

$$\begin{align}
E(k) & \propto k_\perp^{-5/3}; \\[5pt]
k_\parallel & \propto k_\perp^{2/3}
\end{align}$$

The above anisotropic phenomenology has been extended for large cross helicity MHD.

== Solar wind observations ==
Solar wind plasma is in a turbulent state. Researchers have calculated the energy spectra of the solar wind plasma from the data collected from the spacecraft. The kinetic and magnetic energy spectra, as well as $E^{\pm}$ are closer to $k^{-5/3}$ compared to $k^{-3/2}$, thus favoring Kolmogorov-like phenomenology for MHD turbulence. The interplanetary and interstellar electron density fluctuations also provide a window for investigating MHD turbulence.

== Numerical simulations ==
The theoretical models discussed above are tested using the high resolution direct numerical simulation (DNS). Number of recent simulations report the spectral indices to be closer to 5/3. There are others that report the spectral indices near 3/2. The regime of power law is typically less than a decade. Since 5/3 and 3/2 are quite close numerically, it is quite difficult to ascertain the validity of MHD turbulence models from the energy spectra.

Energy fluxes $\Pi^{\pm}$ can be more reliable quantities to validate MHD turbulence models. When $E^+(k) \gg E^-(k)$ (high cross helicity fluid or imbalanced MHD) the energy flux predictions of Kraichnan and Iroshnikov model is very different from that of Kolmogorov-like model. It has been shown using DNS that the fluxes $\Pi^{\pm}$ computed from the numerical simulations are in better agreement with Kolmogorov-like model compared to Kraichnan and Iroshnikov model.

Anisotropic aspects of MHD turbulence have also been studied using numerical simulations. The predictions of Goldreich and Sridhar ($k_\parallel \sim k_{\perp}^{2/3}$) have been verified in many simulations. The wave turbulence regime which is more difficult to check carefully has also been verified.

== Energy transfer ==
Energy transfer among various scales between the velocity and magnetic field is an important problem in MHD turbulence. These quantities have been computed both theoretically and numerically. These calculations show a significant energy transfer from the large scale velocity field to the large scale magnetic field. Also, the cascade of magnetic energy is typically forward. These results have critical bearing on dynamo problem.

There are many open challenges in this field that hopefully will be resolved in near future with the help of numerical simulations, theoretical modelling, experiments, and observations (e.g., solar wind).

== See also ==
- Magnetohydrodynamics
- Turbulence
- Alfvén wave
- Solar dynamo
- Reynolds number
- Navier–Stokes equations
- Computational magnetohydrodynamics
- Computational fluid dynamics
- Solar wind
- Magnetic flow meter
- Ionic liquid
