= Magnetic reconnection =

Process in plasma physics

Magnetic reconnection: This view is a cross-section through four magnetic domains undergoing separator Parker-Sweet reconnection. Two separatrices (see text) divide space into four magnetic domains with a separator at the center of the figure. Field lines (and associated plasma) flow inward from above and below the separator, reconnect, and spring outward along the current sheet. In-situ spacecraft measurements in the magnetosphere and laboratory plasma experiments mean that this process is increasingly well understood: once started, it proceeds many orders of magnitude faster than predicted by the Parker-Sweet theory.

The evolution of magnetic reconnection during a solar flare.

Magnetic reconnection is a physical process occurring in electrically conducting plasmas, in which the magnetic topology is rearranged and magnetic energy is converted to kinetic energy, thermal energy, and particle acceleration. Magnetic reconnection involves plasma flows at a substantial fraction of the Alfvén wave speed, which is the fundamental speed for mechanical information flow in a magnetized plasma.

The concept of magnetic reconnection was developed in parallel by researchers working in solar physics and in the interaction between the solar wind and magnetized planets. This reflects the bidirectional nature of reconnection, which can either disconnect formerly connected magnetic fields or connect formerly disconnected magnetic fields, depending on the circumstances.

Ron Giovanelli is credited with the first publication invoking magnetic energy release as a potential mechanism for particle acceleration in solar flares. Giovanelli proposed in 1946 that solar flares stem from the energy obtained by charged particles influenced by induced electric fields within close proximity of sunspots. In the years 1947–1948, he published more papers further developing the reconnection model of solar flares. In these works, he proposed that the mechanism occurs at points of neutrality (weak or null magnetic field) within structured magnetic fields.

James Dungey is credited with first use of the term "magnetic reconnection" in his 1950 PhD thesis, to explain the coupling of mass, energy and momentum from the solar wind into Earth's magnetosphere. The concept was published for the first time in a seminal paper in 1961. Dungey coined the term "reconnection" because he envisaged field lines and plasma moving together in an inflow toward a magnetic neutral point (2D) or line (3D), breaking apart and then rejoining again but with different magnetic field lines and plasma, in an outflow away from the magnetic neutral point or line.

In the meantime, the first theoretical framework of magnetic reconnection was established by Peter Sweet and Eugene Parker at a conference in 1956. Sweet pointed out that by pushing two plasmas with oppositely directed magnetic fields together, resistive diffusion is able to occur on a length scale much shorter than a typical equilibrium length scale. Parker was in attendance at this conference and developed scaling relations for this model during his return travel.

== Fundamental principles ==
Magnetic reconnection is a breakdown of "ideal-magnetohydrodynamics" and so of "Alfvén's theorem" (also called the "frozen-in flux theorem") which applies to large-scale regions of a highly-conducting magnetoplasma, for which the Magnetic Reynolds Number is very large: this makes the convective term in the induction equation dominate in such regions. The frozen-in flux theorem states that in such regions the field moves with the plasma velocity (the mean of the ion and electron velocities, weighted by their mass). The reconnection breakdown of this theorem occurs in regions of large magnetic shear (by Ampére's law these are current sheets) which are regions of small width where the Magnetic Reynolds Number can become small enough to make the diffusion term in the induction equation dominate, meaning that the field diffuses through the plasma from regions of high field to regions of low field. In reconnection, the inflow and outflow regions both obey Alfvén's theorem and the diffusion region is a very small region at the centre of the current sheet where field lines diffuse together, merge and reconfigure such that they are transferred from the topology of the inflow regions (i.e., along the current sheet) to that of the outflow regions (i.e., threading the current sheet). The rate of this magnetic flux transfer is the electric field associated with both the inflow and the outflow and is called the "reconnection rate".

The equivalence of magnetic shear and current can be seen from one of Maxwell's equations

$$\nabla \times \mathbf{B} = \mu \mathbf{J} + \mu \varepsilon \frac{\partial \mathbf{E}}{\partial t}.$$

In a plasma (ionized gas), for all but exceptionally high frequency phenomena, the second term on the right-hand side of this equation, the displacement current, is negligible compared to the effect of the free current $\mathbf{J}$ and this equation reduces to Ampére's law for free charges. The displacement current is neglected in both the Parker-Sweet and Petschek theoretical treatments of reconnection, discussed below, and in the derivation of ideal MHD and Alfvén's theorem which is applied in those theories everywhere outside the small diffusion region.

The resistivity of the current layer allows magnetic flux from either side to diffuse through the current layer, cancelling outflux from the other side of the boundary. However, the small spatial scale of the current sheet makes the Magnetic Reynolds Number small and so this alone can make the diffusion term dominate in the induction equation without the resistivity being enhanced. When the diffusing field lines from the two sites of the boundary touch they form the separatrices and so have both the topology of the inflow region (i.e. along the current sheet) and the outflow region (i.e., threading the current sheet). In magnetic reconnection the field lines evolve from the inflow topology through the separatrices topology to the outflow topology. When this happens, the plasma is pulled out by Magnetic tension force acting on the reconfigured field lines and ejecting them along the current sheet. The resulting drop in pressure pulls more plasma and magnetic flux into the central region, yielding a self-sustaining process. The importance of Dungey's concept of a localized breakdown of ideal-MHD is that the outflow along the current sheet prevents the build-up in plasma pressure that would otherwise choke off the inflow. In Parker-Sweet reconnection the outflow is only along a thin layer the centre of the current sheet and this limits the reconnection rate that can be achieved to low values. On the other hand, in Petschek reconnection the outflow region is much broader, being between shock fronts (now thought to be Alfvén waves) that stand in the inflow: this allows much faster escape of the plasma frozen-in on reconnected field lines and the reconnection rate can be much higher.

Dungey coined the term "reconnection" because he initially envisaged field lines of the inflow topology breaking and then joining again in the outflow topology. However, this means that magnetic monopoles would exist, albeit for a very limited period, which would violate Maxwell's equation that the divergence of the field is zero. However, by considering the evolution through the separatrix topology, the need to invoke magnetic monopoles is avoided. Global numerical MHD models of the magnetosphere, which use the equations of ideal MHD, still simulate magnetic reconnection even though it is a breakdown of ideal MHD. The reason is close to Dungey's original thoughts: at each time step of the numerical model the equations of ideal MHD are solved at each grid point of the simulation to evaluate the new field and plasma conditions. The magnetic field lines then have to be re-traced. The tracing algorithm makes errors at thin current sheets and joins field lines up by threading the current sheet where they were previously aligned with the current sheet. This is often called "numerical resistivity" and the simulations have predictive value because the error propagates according to a diffusion equation.

A current problem in plasma physics is that observed reconnection happens much faster than predicted by MHD in high Lundquist number plasmas (i.e. fast magnetic reconnection). Solar flares, for example, proceed 13–14 orders of magnitude faster than a naive calculation would suggest, and several orders of magnitude faster than current theoretical models that include turbulence and kinetic effects. One possible mechanism to explain the discrepancy is that the electromagnetic turbulence in the boundary layer is sufficiently strong to scatter electrons, raising the plasma's local resistivity. This would allow the magnetic flux to diffuse faster.

== Properties ==
A magnetic reconnection event on the sun.

=== Physical interpretation ===
The qualitative description of the reconnection process is such that magnetic field lines from different magnetic domains (defined by the field line connectivity) are spliced to one another, changing their patterns of connectivity with respect to the sources. It is a violation of an approximate conservation law in plasma physics, called Alfvén's theorem (also called the "frozen-in flux theorem") and can concentrate mechanical or magnetic energy in both space and time. A solar flare, a magnetic explosion in the Sun's atmosphere, may involve the reconnection of large systems of magnetic flux, releasing, in minutes, energy that has been stored in the magnetic field over a period of hours to days. Magnetic reconnection in Earth's magnetosphere is one of the mechanisms responsible for the aurora, and it is important to the science of controlled nuclear fusion because it is one mechanism preventing magnetic confinement of the fusion fuel.

In an electrically conductive plasma, magnetic field lines are grouped into 'domains'— bundles of field lines that connect from a particular place to another particular place, and that are topologically distinct from other field lines nearby. This topology is approximately preserved even when the magnetic field itself is strongly distorted by the presence of variable currents or motion of magnetic sources, because effects that might otherwise change the magnetic topology instead induce eddy currents in the plasma; the eddy currents have the effect of canceling out the topological change.

=== Types of reconnection ===
In two dimensions, the most common type of magnetic reconnection is separator reconnection, in which four separate magnetic domains exchange magnetic field lines. Domains in a magnetic plasma are separated by separatrix surfaces: curved surfaces in space that divide different bundles of flux. Field lines on one side of the separatrix all terminate at a particular magnetic pole, while field lines on the other side all terminate at a different pole of similar sign. Since each field line generally begins at a north magnetic pole and ends at a south magnetic pole, the most general way of dividing simple flux systems involves four domains separated by two separatrices: one separatrix surface divides the flux into two bundles, each of which shares a south pole, and the other separatrix surface divides the flux into two bundles, each of which shares a north pole. The intersection of the separatrices forms a separator, a single line that is at the boundary of the four separate domains. In separator reconnection, field lines enter the separator from two of the domains, and are spliced one to the other, exiting the separator in the other two domains (see the first figure).

In three dimensions, the geometry of the field lines become more complicated than the two-dimensional case and it is possible for reconnection to occur in regions where a separator does not exist, but with the field lines connected by steep gradients. These regions are known as quasi-separatrix layers (QSLs), and have been observed in theoretical configurations and solar flares.

== Theoretical descriptions ==
=== Slow reconnection: Sweet–Parker model ===
The first theoretical framework of magnetic reconnection was established by Peter Sweet and Eugene Parker at a conference in 1956. Sweet pointed out that by pushing two plasmas with oppositely directed magnetic fields together, resistive diffusion is able to occur on a length scale much shorter than a typical equilibrium length scale. Parker was in attendance at this conference and developed scaling relations for this model during his return travel.

The Sweet–Parker model describes time-independent magnetic reconnection in the resistive MHD framework when the reconnecting magnetic fields are antiparallel (oppositely directed) and effects related to viscosity and compressibility are unimportant. The initial velocity is simply an $\mathbf{E} \times \mathbf{B}$ velocity, so
$$E_y = v_\text{in} B_\text{in}$$

where $E_y$ is the out-of-plane electric field, $v_\text{in}$ is the characteristic inflow velocity, and $B_\text{in}$ is the characteristic upstream magnetic field strength. By neglecting displacement current, the low-frequency Ampere's law, $\mathbf{J} = \frac{1}{\mu_0} \nabla \times \mathbf{B}$, gives the relation
$$J_y \sim \frac{B_\text{in}}{\mu_0\delta},$$

where $\delta$ is the current sheet half-thickness. This relation uses that the magnetic field reverses over a distance of $\sim2\delta$. By matching the ideal electric field outside of the layer with the resistive electric field $\mathbf{E} = \frac{1}{\sigma} \mathbf{J}$ inside the layer (using Ohm's law), we find that
$$v_\text{in} = \frac{E_y}{B_\text{in}} \sim \frac{1}{\mu_0\sigma\delta} = \frac{\eta}{\delta},$$

where $\eta = \frac{1}{\mu_0 \sigma}$ is the magnetic diffusivity. When the inflow density is comparable to the outflow density, conservation of mass yields the relationship
$$v_\text{in}L \sim v_\text{out}\delta,$$

where $L$ is the half-length of the current sheet and $v_\text{out}$ is the outflow velocity. The left and right hand sides of the above relation represent the mass flux into the layer and out of the layer, respectively. Equating the upstream magnetic pressure with the downstream dynamic pressure gives
$$\frac{B_\text{in}^2}{2\mu_0} \sim \frac{\rho v_\text{out}^2}{2}$$

where $\rho$ is the mass density of the plasma. Solving for the outflow velocity then gives
$$v_\text{out} \sim \frac{B_\text{in}}{\sqrt{\mu_0\rho}} \equiv v_\text{A}$$

where $v_\text{A}$ is the Alfvén velocity. With the above relations, the dimensionless reconnection rate $R$ can then be written in two forms, the first in terms of $(\eta, \delta, v_\text{A})$ using the result earlier derived from Ohm's law, the second in terms of $(\delta, L)$ from the conservation of mass as
$$R = \frac{v_\text{in}}{v_\text{out}} \sim \frac{\eta}{v_\text{A}\delta} \sim \frac{\delta}{L}.$$

Since the dimensionless Lundquist number $S$ is given by
$$S \equiv \frac{Lv_\text{A}}{\eta},$$

the two different expressions of $R$ are multiplied by each other and then square-rooted, giving a simple relation between the reconnection rate $R$ and the Lundquist number $S$
$$R ~ \sim \sqrt{\frac{\eta}{v_\text{A} L}} = S^{-{1}/{2}}.$$

Sweet–Parker reconnection allows for reconnection rates much faster than global diffusion, but is not able to explain the fast reconnection rates observed in solar flares, the Earth's magnetosphere, and laboratory plasmas. Additionally, Sweet–Parker reconnection neglects three-dimensional effects, collisionless physics, time-dependent effects, viscosity, compressibility, and downstream pressure. Numerical simulations of two-dimensional magnetic reconnection typically show agreement with this model. Results from the Magnetic Reconnection Experiment (MRX) of collisional reconnection show agreement with a generalized Sweet–Parker model which incorporates compressibility, downstream pressure and anomalous resistivity.

=== Fast reconnection: Petschek model ===
The fundamental reason that Petschek reconnection is faster than Parker-Sweet is that it broadens the outflow region and thereby removes some of the limitation caused by the build up in plasma pressure. The inflow velocity, and thus the reconnection rate, can only be very small if the outflow region is narrow. In 1964, Harry Petschek proposed a mechanism where the inflow and outflow regions are separated by stationary slow mode shocks that stand in the inflows. The aspect ratio of the diffusion region is then of order unity and the maximum reconnection rate becomes
$$\frac{v_\text{in}}{v_\text{A}} \approx \frac{\pi}{8 \ln S}.$$

This expression allows for fast reconnection and is almost independent of the Lundquist number. Theory and numerical simulations show that most of the actions of the shocks that were proposed by Petschek can be carried out by Alfvén waves and in particular rotational discontinuities (RDs). In cases of asymmetric plasma densities on the two sides of the current sheet (as at Earth's dayside magnetopause) the Alfvén wave that propagates into the inflow on higher-density side (in the case of the magnetopause the denser magnetosheath) has a lower propagation speed and so the field rotation increasingly becomes at that RD as the field line propagates away from the reconnection site: hence the magnetopause current sheet becomes increasingly concentrated in the outer, slower, RD.

Simulations of resistive MHD reconnection with uniform resistivity showed the development of elongated current sheets in agreement with the Sweet–Parker model rather than the Petschek model. When a localized anomalously large resistivity is used, however, Petschek reconnection can be realized in resistive MHD simulations. Because the use of an anomalous resistivity is only appropriate when the particle mean free path is large compared to the reconnection layer, it is likely that other collisionless effects become important before Petschek reconnection can be realized.

=== Anomalous resistivity and Bohm diffusion ===
In the Sweet–Parker model, the common assumption is that the magnetic diffusivity is constant. This can be estimated using the equation of motion for an electron with mass $m$ and electric charge $e$:

$${d{\mathbf{v}} \over dt} = {e \over m}\mathbf{E} - \nu\mathbf{v},$$

where $\nu$ is the collision frequency. Since in the steady state, $d{\mathbf{v}}/dt = 0$, then the above equation along with the definition of electric current, ${\mathbf{J}} = en{\mathbf{v}}$, where $n$ is the electron number density, yields

$$\eta = \nu{c^2 \over \omega_{pi}^2}.$$

Nevertheless, if the drift velocity of electrons exceeds the thermal velocity of plasma, a steady state cannot be achieved and magnetic diffusivity should be much larger than what is given in the above. This is called anomalous resistivity, $\eta_\text{anom}$, which can enhance the reconnection rate in the Sweet–Parker model by a factor of $\eta_\text{anom}/\eta$.

Another proposed mechanism is known as the Bohm diffusion across the magnetic field. This replaces the Ohmic resistivity with $v_\text{A}^2 (mc/eB)$, however, its effect, similar to the anomalous resistivity, is still too small compared with the observations.

=== Stochastic reconnection ===
In stochastic reconnection, magnetic field has a small scale random component arising because of turbulence. For the turbulent flow in the reconnection region, a model for magnetohydrodynamic turbulence should be used such as the model developed by Goldreich and Sridhar in 1995. This stochastic model is independent of small scale physics such as resistive effects and depends only on turbulent effects. Roughly speaking, in stochastic model, turbulence brings initially distant magnetic field lines to small separations where they can reconnect locally (Sweet-Parker type reconnection) and separate again due to turbulent super-linear diffusion (Richardson diffusion). For a current sheet of the length $L$, the upper limit for reconnection velocity is given by

$$v = v_\text{turb} \; \min\left[\sqrt \frac{L}{\ell}, \, \sqrt \frac{\ell}{L} \right],$$

where $v_\text{turb} = v_\ell^2/v_\text{A}$. Here $\ell$, and $v_\ell$ are turbulence injection length scale and velocity respectively and $v_\text{A}$ is the Alfvén velocity. This model has been successfully tested by numerical simulations.

=== Non-MHD process: Collisionless reconnection ===
On length scales shorter than the ion inertial length $c / \omega_{pi}$ (where $\omega_{pi} \equiv \sqrt{\frac{n_i Z^2 e^2}{\varepsilon_0 m_i}}$ is the ion plasma frequency), ions decouple from electrons and the magnetic field becomes frozen into the electron fluid rather than the bulk plasma. On these scales, the Hall effect becomes important. Two-fluid simulations show the formation of an X-point geometry rather than the double Y-point geometry characteristic of resistive reconnection. The electrons are then accelerated to very high speeds by Whistler waves. Because the ions can move through a wider "bottleneck" near the current layer and because the electrons are moving much faster in Hall MHD than in standard MHD, reconnection may proceed more quickly. Two-fluid/collisionless reconnection is particularly important in the Earth's magnetosphere.

== Observations ==
=== Solar atmosphere ===
Magnetic reconnection occurs during solar flares, coronal mass ejections, and many other events in the solar atmosphere. The observational evidence for solar flares includes observations of inflows/outflows, downflowing loops, and changes in the magnetic topology. In the past, observations of the solar atmosphere were done using remote imaging; consequently, the magnetic fields were inferred or extrapolated rather than observed directly. However, the first direct observations of solar magnetic reconnection were gathered in 2012 (and released in 2013) by the High Resolution Coronal Imager.

=== Earth's magnetosphere ===
Magnetic reconnection events that occur in the Earth's magnetosphere (in the dayside magnetopause and in the magnetotail) were for many years inferred because they uniquely explained many aspects of the large-scale behaviour of the magnetosphere and its dependence on the orientation of the near-Earth Interplanetary magnetic field. Subsequently, spacecraft such as Cluster II and the Magnetospheric Multiscale Mission. have made observations of sufficient resolution and in multiple locations to observe the process directly and in-situ. Cluster II is a four-spacecraft mission, with the four spacecraft arranged in a tetrahedron to separate the spatial and temporal changes as the suite flies through space. It has observed numerous reconnection events in which the Earth's magnetic field reconnects with that of the Sun (i.e. the Interplanetary Magnetic Field). These include 'reverse reconnection' that causes sunward convection in the Earth's ionosphere near the polar cusps; 'dayside reconnection', which allows the transmission of particles and energy into the Earth's vicinity and 'tail reconnection', which causes auroral substorms by injecting particles deep into the magnetosphere and releasing the energy stored in the Earth's magnetotail. The Magnetospheric Multiscale Mission, launched on 13 March 2015, improved the spatial and temporal resolution of the Cluster II results by having a tighter constellation of spacecraft. This led to a better understanding of the behavior of the electrical currents in the electron diffusion region.

On 26 February 2008, THEMIS probes were able to determine the triggering event for the onset of magnetospheric substorms. Two of the five probes, positioned approximately one third the distance to the Moon, measured events suggesting a magnetic reconnection event 96 seconds prior to auroral intensification. Vassilis Angelopoulos of the University of California, Los Angeles, who is the principal investigator for the THEMIS mission, claimed, "Our data show clearly and for the first time that magnetic reconnection is the trigger.".

=== Laboratory plasma experiments ===
Magnetic reconnection has also been observed in numerous laboratory experiments. For example, studies on the Large Plasma Device (LAPD) at UCLA have observed and mapped quasi-separatrix layers near the magnetic reconnection region of a two flux rope system, while experiments on the Magnetic Reconnection Experiment (MRX) at the Princeton Plasma Physics Laboratory (PPPL) have confirmed many aspects of magnetic reconnection, including the Sweet–Parker model in regimes where the model is applicable. Analysis of the physics of helicity injection, used to create the initial plasma current in the NSTX spherical tokamak, led Fatima Ebrahimi to propose a plasma thruster that uses fast magnetic reconnection to accelerate plasma to produce thrust for space propulsion.

Sawtooth oscillations are periodic mixing events occurring in the tokamak plasma core. The Kadomtsev model describes sawtooth oscillations as a consequence of magnetic reconnection due to displacement of the central region with safety factor $q < 1$ caused by the internal kink mode.

== See also ==
- Current sheet
- Solar corona
- Magnetic switchback
