= Shocks and discontinuities (magnetohydrodynamics) =

In magnetohydrodynamics (MHD), shocks and discontinuities are transition layers where properties of a plasma change from one equilibrium state to another. The relation between the plasma properties on both sides of a shock or a discontinuity can be obtained from the conservative form of the MHD equations, assuming conservation of mass, momentum, energy and of $\nabla \cdot \mathbf{B}$.

== Rankine–Hugoniot jump conditions for MHD ==
The jump conditions across a time-independent MHD shock or discontinuity are referred as the Rankine–Hugoniot equations for MHD. In the frame moving with the shock/discontinuity, those jump conditions can be written:
$$\begin{cases}
\rho_1 v_{1 \perp} = \rho_2 v_{2 \perp}, \\[1.2ex]
B_{1 \perp} = B_{2 \perp}, \\[1.2ex]
\rho_1 v_{1 \perp}^2 + p_1 + \frac{1}{2 \mu_0} B_{1 \parallel}^2 = \rho_2 v_{2 \perp}^2+ p_2 + \frac{1}{2 \mu_0} B_{2 \parallel}^2, \\[1.2ex]
\rho_1 v_{1 \perp} \mathbf{v}_{1 \parallel} - \frac{1}{\mu_0} \mathbf{B}_{1 \parallel} B_{1 \perp} =
\rho_2 v_{2 \perp} \mathbf{v}_{2 \parallel} - \frac{1}{\mu_0} \mathbf{B}_{2 \parallel} B_{2 \perp}, \\[1.2ex]
\displaystyle \left(\frac{\gamma}{\gamma-1}\frac{p_1}{\rho_1} + \frac{v_1^2}{2}\right) \rho_1 v_{1 \perp} + \frac{1}{\mu_0} \left[ {v_{1 \perp} B_{1 \parallel}^2} - {B_{1 \perp}(\mathbf{B}_{1 \parallel} \cdot \mathbf{v}_{1 \parallel})} \right] =
\left(\frac{\gamma}{\gamma-1}\frac{p_2}{\rho_2} + \frac{v_2^2}{2}\right) \rho_2 v_{2 \perp} + \frac{1}{\mu_0} \left[ {v_{2 \perp} B_{2 \parallel}^2} - {B_{2 \perp}(\mathbf{B}_{2 \parallel} \cdot \mathbf{v}_{2 \parallel})} \right], \\[1.2ex]
(\mathbf{v} \times \mathbf{B})_{1 \parallel} =  (\mathbf{v} \times \mathbf{B})_{2 \parallel},
\end{cases}$$
where $\rho$, v, p, B are the plasma density, velocity, (thermal) pressure and magnetic field respectively. The subscripts $\parallel$ and $\perp$ refer to the tangential and normal components of a vector (with respect to the shock/discontinuity front). The subscripts 1 and 2 refer to the two states of the plasma on each side of the shock/discontinuity

== Contact and tangential discontinuities ==
Contact and tangential discontinuities are transition layers across which there is no particle transport. Thus, in the frame moving with the discontinuity, $v_{1 \perp} = v_{2 \perp} = 0$.

Contact discontinuities are discontinuities for which the thermal pressure, the magnetic field and the velocity are continuous. Only the mass density and temperature change.

Tangential discontinuities are discontinuities for which the total pressure (sum of the thermal and magnetic pressures) is conserved. The normal component of the magnetic field is identically zero. The density, thermal pressure and tangential component of the magnetic field vector can be discontinuous across the layer.

== Shocks ==
Shocks are transition layers across which there is a transport of particles. There are three types of shocks in MHD: slow-mode, intermediate and fast-mode shocks.

Intermediate shocks are non-compressive (meaning that the plasma density does not change across the shock). A special case of the intermediate shock is referred to as a rotational discontinuity. They are isentropic. All thermodynamic quantities are continuous across the shock, but the tangential component of the magnetic field can "rotate". Intermediate shocks in general however, unlike rotational discontinuities, can have a discontinuity in the pressure.

Slow-mode and fast-mode shocks are compressive and are associated with an increase in entropy. Across slow-mode shock, the tangential component of the magnetic field decreases. Across fast-mode shock it increases.

The type of shocks depend on the relative magnitude of the upstream velocity in the frame moving with the shock with respect to some characteristic speed. Those characteristic speeds, the slow and fast magnetosonic speeds, are related to the Alfvén speed, $V_A$ and the sonic speed, $c_s$ as follows:
$$\begin{align}
a_{\text{slow}}^2 &= \frac{1}{2} \left[\left(c_s^2 + V_A^2\right)-\sqrt{\left(c_s^2+V_A^2\right)^2-4c_s^2V_{A}^2 \cos^{2} \theta_{Bn}}\,\right], \\[1ex]
a_{\text{fast}}^2 &= \frac{1}{2} \left[\left(c_s^2 + V_A^2\right)+\sqrt{\left(c_s^2+V_A^2\right)^2-4c_s^2V_{A}^2 \cos^{2} \theta_{Bn}}\,\right],
\end{align}$$
where $V_{A}$ is the Alfvén speed and $\theta_{Bn}$ is the angle between the incoming magnetic field and the shock normal vector.

The normal component of the slow shock propagates with velocity $a_{\mathrm{slow} }$ in the frame moving with the upstream plasma, that of the intermediate shock with velocity $V_{An}$ and that of the fast shock with velocity $a_{\mathrm{fast}}$. The fast mode waves have higher phase velocities than the slow mode waves because the density and magnetic field are in phase, whereas the slow mode wave components are out of phase.

== Example of shocks and discontinuities in space ==
- The Earth's bow shock, which is the boundary where the solar wind's speed drops due to the presence of Earth's magnetosphere is a fast mode shock. The termination shock is a fast-mode shock due to the interaction of the solar wind with the interstellar medium.
- Magnetic reconnection can happen associated with a slow-mode shock (Petschek or fast magnetic reconnection) in the solar corona.
- The existence of intermediate shocks is still a matter of debate. They may form in MHD simulation, but their stability has not been proven.
- Discontinuities (both contact and tangential) are observed in the solar wind, behind astrophysical shock waves (supernova remnant) or due to the interaction of multiple CME driven shock waves.
- The Earth's magnetopause is generally a tangential discontinuity.
- Coronal Mass Ejections (CMEs) moving at super-Alfvénic speeds are able to drive fast-mode MHD shocks while propagating away from the Sun into the solar wind. Signatures of these shocks have been identified in both radio (as type II radio bursts) and ultraviolet (UV) spectra.

== See also ==
- Alfvén wave
- Magnetohydrodynamics
- Moreton wave
- Rankine–Hugoniot conditions
- Shock wave
