= Magnetic Prandtl number =

The Magnetic Prandtl number (Pr_{m}) is a dimensionless quantity occurring in magnetohydrodynamics which approximates the ratio of momentum diffusivity (viscosity) and magnetic diffusivity. It is defined as:

$$\mathrm{{Pr}_m} = \frac{\mathrm{{Re}_m}}{\mathrm{Re}} = \frac{\nu}{\eta} = \frac{\text{viscous diffusion rate}}{\text{magnetic diffusion rate}}$$

where:

- Re_{m} is the magnetic Reynolds number
- Re is the Reynolds number
- ν is the momentum diffusivity (kinematic viscosity)
- η is the magnetic diffusivity

At the base of the Sun's convection zone the Magnetic Prandtl number is approximately 10^{−2}, and in the interiors of planets and in liquid-metal laboratory dynamos is approximately 10^{−5}.

== See also ==
- Prandtl number
