= Lundquist number =

Dimensionless quantity in plasma physics

In plasma physics, the Lundquist number (denoted by $S$) is a dimensionless ratio which compares the timescale of an Alfvén wave crossing to the timescale of resistive diffusion. It is a special case of the magnetic Reynolds number when the Alfvén velocity is the typical velocity scale of the system, and is given by

$$S = \frac{Lv_A}{\eta} ,$$

where $L$ is the typical length scale of the system, $\eta$ is the magnetic diffusivity and $v_A$ is the Alfvén velocity of the plasma.

High Lundquist numbers indicate highly conducting plasmas, while low Lundquist numbers indicate more resistive plasmas. Laboratory plasma experiments typically have Lundquist numbers between 10^{2}–10^{8}, while in astrophysical situations the Lundquist number can be greater than 10^{20}. Considerations of Lundquist number are especially important in magnetic reconnection.

== See also ==
- Magnetic Prandtl number
- Péclet number
- Stuart number
