= Magnetosphere =

Region around an astronomical object

Artist's impression of a magnetosphere

In astronomy and planetary science, a magnetosphere is a region of space surrounding an astronomical object, such as a planet or other object, in which charged particles are affected by that object's magnetic field. It is created by a celestial body with an active interior dynamo.

In the space environment close to a planetary body with a dipole magnetic field such as Earth, the field lines resemble a simple magnetic dipole. Farther out, field lines can be significantly distorted by the flow of electrically conducting plasma, as emitted from the Sun (i.e., the solar wind) or a nearby star. Planets having active magnetospheres, like the Earth, are capable of mitigating or blocking the effects of solar radiation or cosmic radiation. Interactions of particles and atmospheres with magnetospheres are studied under the specialized scientific subjects of plasma physics, space physics, and aeronomy.

== History ==
Study of Earth's magnetosphere began in 1600, when William Gilbert discovered that the magnetic field on the surface of Earth resembled that of a terrella, a small, magnetized sphere. In the 1940s, Walter M. Elsasser proposed the model of dynamo theory, which attributes Earth's magnetic field to the motion of Earth's iron outer core. Through the use of magnetometers, scientists were able to study the variations in Earth's magnetic field as functions of both time and latitude and longitude.

Beginning in the late 1940s, rockets were used to study cosmic rays. In 1958, Explorer 1, the first of the Explorer series of space missions, was launched to study the intensity of cosmic rays above the atmosphere and measure the fluctuations in this activity. This mission observed the existence of the Van Allen radiation belt (located in the inner region of Earth's magnetosphere), with the follow-up Explorer 3 later that year definitively proving its existence. Also during 1958, Eugene Parker proposed the idea of the solar wind, with the term 'magnetosphere' being proposed by Thomas Gold in 1959 to explain how the solar wind interacted with the Earth's magnetic field. The later mission of Explorer 12 in 1961 led by the Cahill and Amazeen observation in 1963 of a sudden decrease in magnetic field strength near the noon-time meridian, later was named the magnetopause. By 1983, the International Cometary Explorer observed the magnetotail, or the distant magnetic field.

== Structure and behavior ==
The structure of magnetospheres are dependent on several factors: the type of astronomical object, the nature of sources of plasma and momentum, the period of the object's spin, the nature of the axis about which the object spins, the axis of the magnetic dipole, and the magnitude and direction of the flow of solar wind.

The planetary distance where the magnetosphere can withstand the solar wind pressure is called the Chapman–Ferraro distance $R_{\rm CF}$. This is usefully modeled by the formula wherein $R_{\rm P}$ represents the radius of the planet, $B_{\rm surf}$ represents the magnetic field on the surface of the planet at the equator, $V_{\rm SW}$ represents the velocity of the solar wind, $\rho$ is the particle density of solar wind, and $\mu_{0}$ is the vacuum permeability constant:

$$R_{\rm CF}=R_{\rm P} \left( \frac{B_{\rm surf}^2}{\mu_{0} \rho V_{\rm SW}^2} \right) ^{\frac{1}{6}}$$

A magnetosphere is classified as "intrinsic" when $R_{\rm CF} \gg R_{\rm P}$, or when the primary opposition to the flow of solar wind is the magnetic field of the object. Mercury, Earth, Jupiter, Ganymede, Saturn, Uranus, and Neptune, for example, exhibit intrinsic magnetospheres. A magnetosphere is classified as "induced" when $R_{\rm CF} \ll R_{\rm P}$, or when the solar wind is not opposed by the object's magnetic field. In this case, the solar wind interacts with the atmosphere or ionosphere of the planet (or surface of the planet, if the planet has no atmosphere). Venus has an induced magnetic field, which means that because Venus appears to have no internal dynamo effect, the only magnetic field present is that formed by the solar wind's wrapping around the physical obstacle of Venus (see also Venus' induced magnetosphere). When $R_{\rm CF} \approx R_{\rm P}$, the planet itself and its magnetic field both contribute. It is possible that Mars is of this type.

=== Dawn-dusk asymmetry ===
When viewed from the Sun, a celestial body's orbital motion can compress its otherwise symmetrical magnetosphere slightly, and stretch it out in the direction opposite its motion (in Earth's example, from west to east). This is known as dawn-dusk asymmetry.

== Structure ==
An artist's rendering of the structure of a magnetosphere: 1) Bow shock. 2) Magnetosheath. 3) Magnetopause. 4) Magnetosphere. 5) Northern tail lobe. 6) Southern tail lobe. 7) Plasmasphere.

=== Bow shock ===
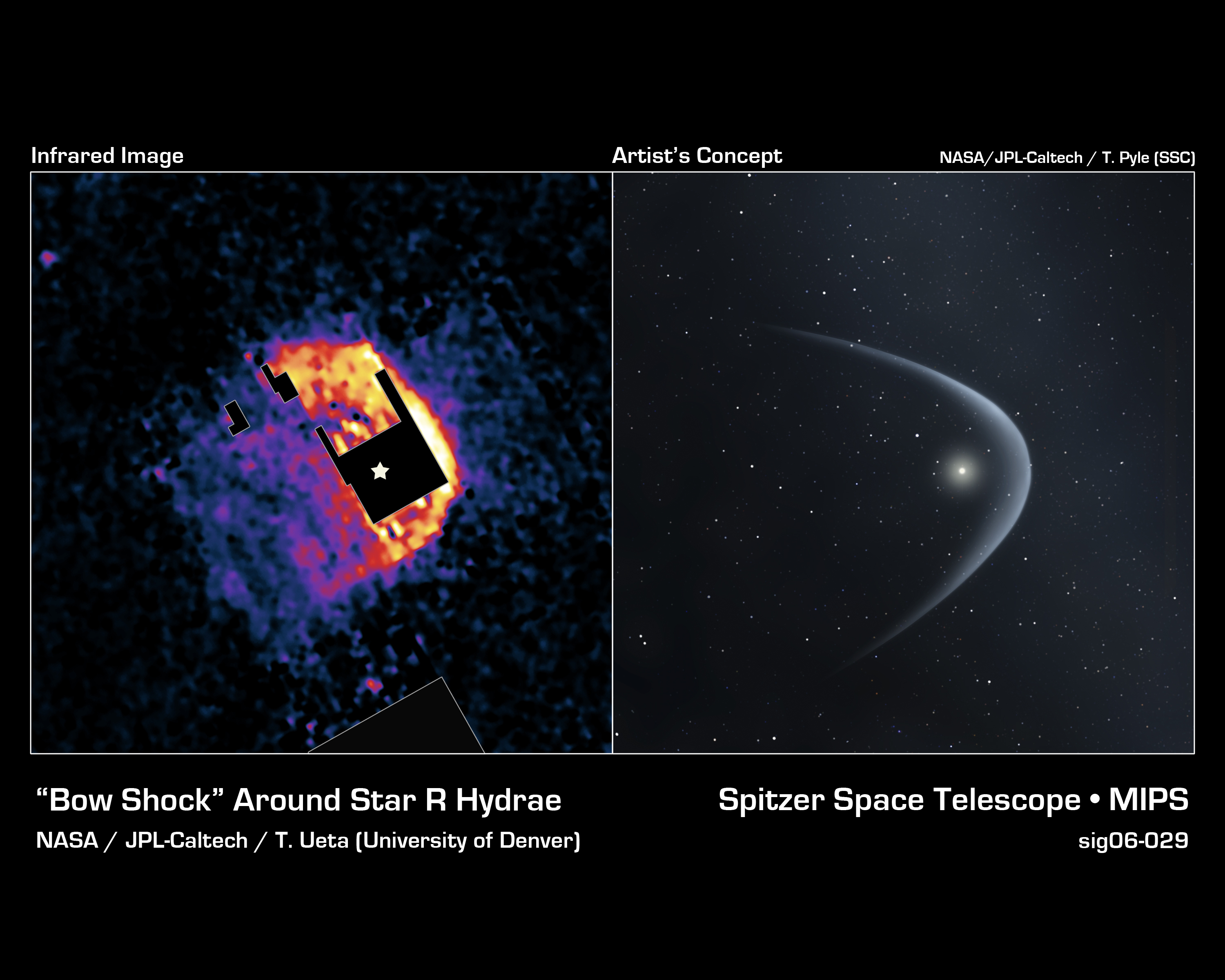
Infrared image (by the Spitzer Space Telescope) and artist's concept of the bow shock around R Hydrae

The bow shock forms the outermost layer of the magnetosphere; the boundary between the magnetosphere and the surrounding medium. For stars, this is usually the boundary between the stellar wind and interstellar medium; for planets, the speed of the solar wind there decreases as it approaches the magnetopause. Due to interactions with the bow shock, the stellar wind plasma gains a substantial anisotropy, leading to various plasma instabilities upstream and downstream of the bow shock.

=== Magnetosheath ===
The magnetosheath is the region of the magnetosphere between the bow shock and the magnetopause. It is formed mainly from shocked solar wind, though it contains a small amount of plasma from the magnetosphere. It is an area exhibiting high particle energy flux, where the direction and magnitude of the magnetic field varies erratically. This is caused by the collection of solar wind gas that has effectively undergone thermalization. It acts as a cushion that transmits the pressure from the flow of the solar wind and the barrier of the magnetic field from the object.

=== Magnetopause ===
The magnetopause is the area of the magnetosphere wherein the pressure from the planetary magnetic field is balanced with the pressure from the solar wind. It is the convergence of the shocked solar wind from the magnetosheath with the magnetic field of the object and plasma from the magnetosphere. Because both sides of this convergence contain magnetized plasma, the interactions between them are complex. The structure of the magnetopause depends upon the Mach number and beta ratio of the plasma, as well as the magnetic field. The magnetopause changes size and shape as the pressure from the solar wind fluctuates.

=== Magnetotail ===
Opposite the compressed magnetic field is the magnetotail, where the magnetosphere extends far beyond the astronomical object. It contains two lobes, referred to as the northern and southern tail lobes. Magnetic field lines in the northern tail lobe point towards the object while those in the southern tail lobe point away. The tail lobes are almost empty, with few charged particles opposing the flow of the solar wind. The two lobes are separated by a plasma sheet, an area where the magnetic field is weaker, and the density of charged particles is higher.

=== Earth's magnetosphere ===
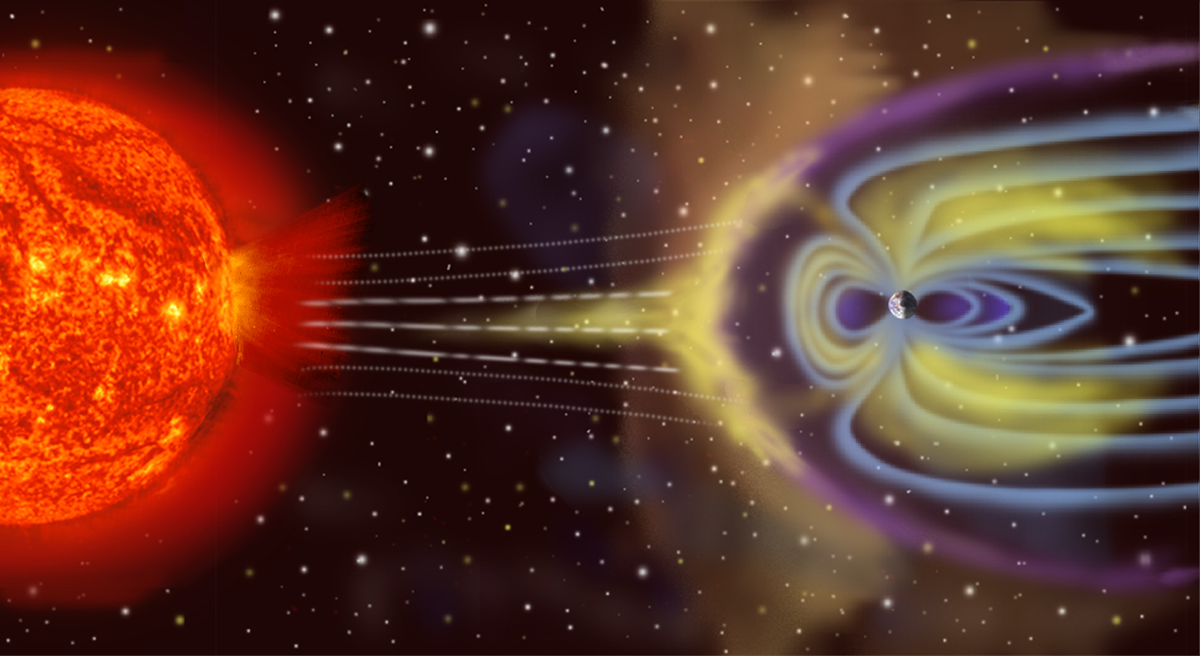
Artist's rendition of Earth's magnetosphere

Diagram of Earth's magnetosphere

Over Earth's equator, the magnetic field lines become almost horizontal, then return to reconnect at high latitudes. However, at high altitudes, the magnetic field is significantly distorted by the solar wind and its solar magnetic field. On the dayside of Earth, the magnetic field is significantly compressed by the solar wind to a distance of approximately 65,000 kilometers (40,000 mi). Earth's bow shock is about 17 kilometers (11 mi) thick and located about 90,000 kilometers (56,000 mi) from Earth. The dayside magnetopause exists at a distance of about 30,000–60,000 kilometers above Earth's surface. Earth's magnetopause has been compared to a sieve because it allows solar wind particles to enter. Kelvin–Helmholtz instabilities occur when large swirls of plasma travel along the edge of the magnetosphere at different velocities from the magnetosphere, causing the plasma to slip past. This results in magnetic reconnection, and as the magnetic field lines break and reconnect, solar wind particles are able to enter the magnetosphere. On Earth's nightside, the magnetic field extends in the magnetotail, which lengthwise exceeds 6,300,000 kilometers (3,900,000 mi). Earth's magnetotail is the primary source of the polar aurora. Also, NASA scientists have suggested that Earth's magnetotail might cause "dust storms" on the Moon by creating a potential difference between the day side and the night side. The center of the tail's plasma sheet, referred to as the neutral sheet, is the region in which the magnetic field lines from each lobe can meet. It is therefore an important site of reconnection in the tail. Far from quiescent, the plasma sheet is known to exhibit bulk motions that tilt the neutral sheet relative to the ecliptic plane, producing oscillations referred to as flapping motions. These motions consist of oscillations of the plasma sheet in the north-south direction. An analogy with windsocks may be helpful in visualising these movements of the plasma sheet.

=== Other objects ===
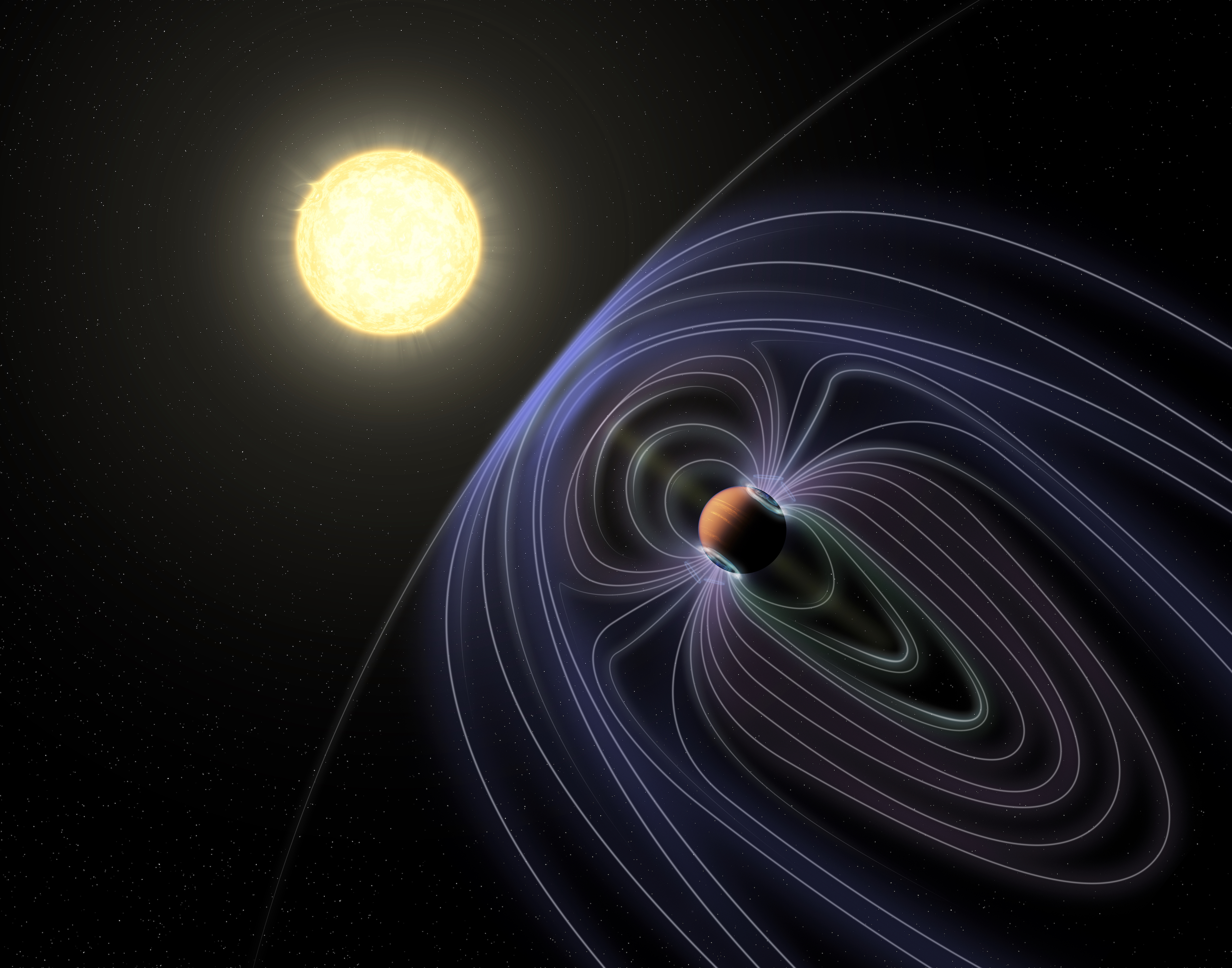
Artist impression of the magnetic field around Tau Boötis b detected in 2020

Many astronomical objects generate and maintain magnetospheres. In the Solar System this includes the Sun, Mercury, Earth, Jupiter, Saturn, Uranus, Neptune, and Ganymede. The magnetosphere of Jupiter is the largest planetary magnetosphere in the Solar System, extending up to 7,000,000 kilometers (4,300,000 mi) on the dayside and almost to the orbit of Saturn on the nightside. Jupiter's magnetosphere is stronger than Earth's by an order of magnitude, and its magnetic moment is approximately 18,000 times larger. Venus, Mars, and Pluto, on the other hand, have no intrinsic magnetic field. This may have had significant effects on their geological history. It is hypothesized that Venus and Mars may have lost their primordial water to photodissociation and the solar wind. A strong magnetosphere, were it present, would greatly slow down this process.

Magnetospheres of the Solar System
Magnetosphere	Surface equatorial field (microteslas)	(Distance to magnetopause)/(Planetary radius)	Upstream Alfvén Mach number	(Surface magnetic pressure)/(Exterior magnetic pressure)	(Solar wind speed)/(Rotation speed) at magnetopause
Mercury	0.14-0.4	1.5	6	1	3×10^{5}
Earth	31	10	7	4×10^{5}	90
Mars	<0.01	n/a	8	<0.04	n/a
Jupiter	428	70	10	7×10^{8}	0.4
Ganymede	0.72	1.6	0.4	50	n/a
Saturn	22	20	12	7×10^{7}	2
Uranus	23	18	13	4×10^{7}	7
Neptune	14	24	15	4×10^{7}	6

Magnetospheres generated by exoplanets are thought to be common, though the first discoveries did not come until the 2010s. In 2014, a magnetic field around HD 209458 b was inferred from the way hydrogen was evaporating from the planet. In 2019, the strength of the surface magnetic fields of 4 hot Jupiters were estimated and ranged between 20 and 120 gauss compared to Jupiter's surface magnetic field of 4.3 gauss. In 2020, a radio emission in the 14-30 MHz band was detected from the Tau Boötis system, likely associated with cyclotron radiation from the poles of Tau Boötis b which might be a signature of a planetary magnetic field. In 2021 a magnetic field generated by the hot Neptune HAT-P-11b became the first to be confirmed. The first unconfirmed detection of a magnetic field generated by a terrestrial exoplanet was found in 2023 on YZ Ceti b.

== See also ==
- Geospace
- Plasma (physics)
