= Fatima Ebrahimi =

Iranian-American physicist

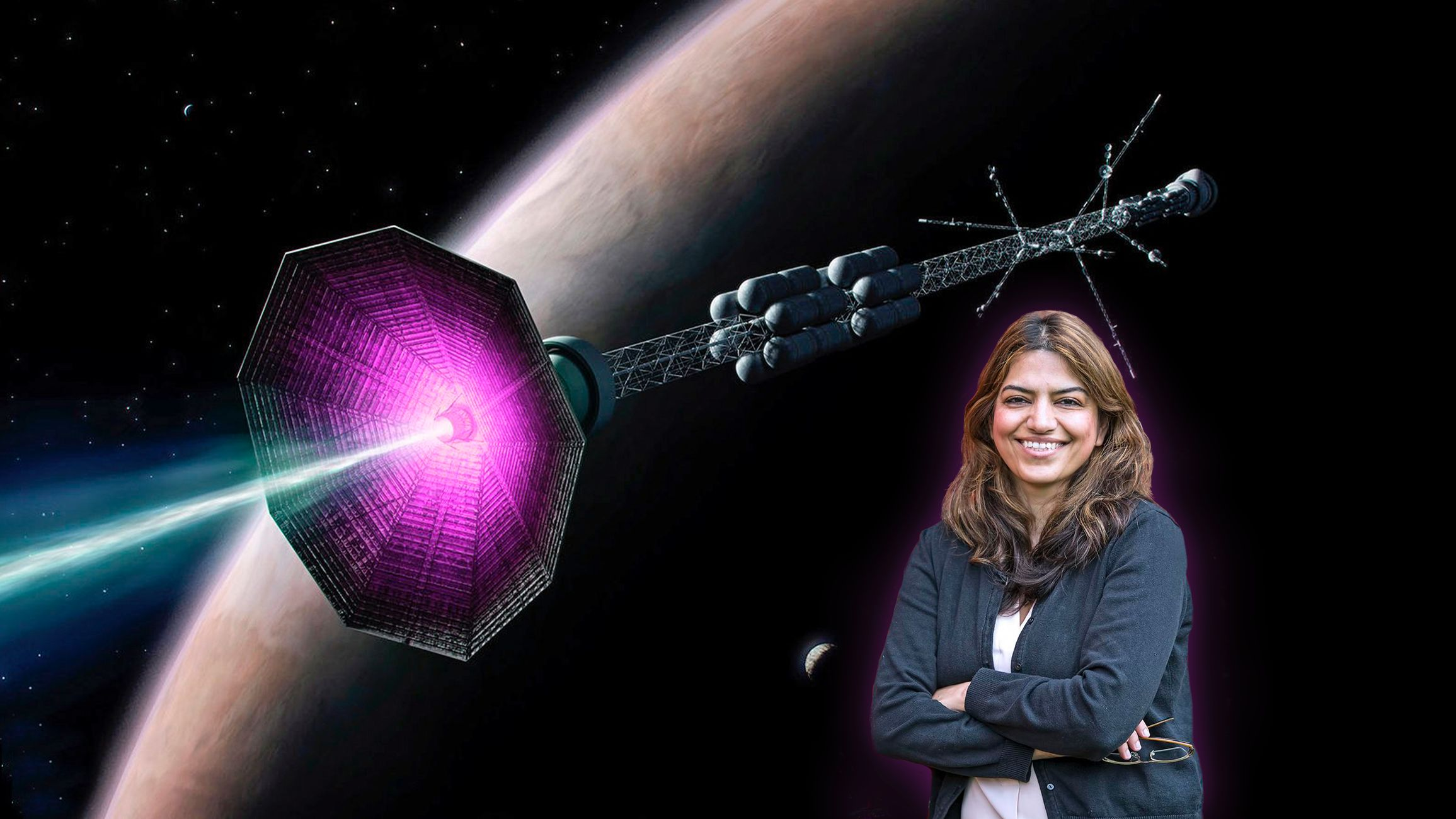
PPPL physicist Fatima Ebrahimi in front of an artist's conception of a fusion rocket

Fatima Ebrahimi is an Iranian-American physicist and inventor. She carries out theoretical and computational plasma physics research for applications including fusion energy and space and astrophysical plasmas.

== Biography ==
Ebrahimi received BSc and MSc degrees in physics from Tehran Polytechnic in 1993 and 1996, respectively, and a PhD in plasma physics at the University of Wisconsin–Madison in 2003 under the supervision of Stewart Prager. Her approach to plasma physics has been characterized as "applying knowledge from her fusion research in the laboratory to astrophysics and vice versa". She is a principal research physicist at the Princeton Plasma Physics Laboratory Theory Department and an affiliated research scholar at the Department of Astrophysical Sciences, Princeton University. She is the Principal Investigator of the Department of Energy SciDAC project "Center for Edge of Tokamak Optimization" (CETOP).

== Scientific Contributions ==
Ebrahimi's most notable contribution to science has been her research on how plasmoids (plasma objects enclosed by magnetic fields) can be used to create the initial plasma current in compact spherical tokamaks and produce thrust for space propulsion. Her proposed electromagnetic plasma thruster utilizes magnetic reconnection for magnetic-to-kinetic energy conversion, emulating the physical mechanism that generates solar flares. Simulations on NERSC supercomputers demonstrated that thrust is generated by expulsion of continuously created plasmoids, when magnetic helicity is injected into an annular thruster channel.

Princeton University has a patent on her thruster technology, which "may come to be known as the Ebrahimi Drive – an engine inspired by fusion reactors and the incredible power of solar Coronal Mass Ejections". Ebrahimi has also done research on the magnetorotational instability and demonstrated in global simulations its importance for the dynamo of astrophysical disks and for plasmoid reconnection.

== Awards and Honors ==
Ebrahimi received the 2025 John Dawson Award for Excellence in Plasma Physics Research. She is a Fellow of the American Physical Society Division of Plasma Physics.
