= Magnetic topology =

Magnetic field structure and linkage

In plasma physics, the magnetic topology of a plasma is the structure and linkage of its magnetic field.

The magnetic topology of a plasma can be changed through magnetic diffusion and reconnection. In the limit of a large magnetic Reynolds number, however, diffusion and reconnection of the magnetic field cannot occur, and the magnetic topology is preserved.

== See also ==
- Helmet streamer#Pseudostreamers
