= Current sheet =

Electric current confined to a surface

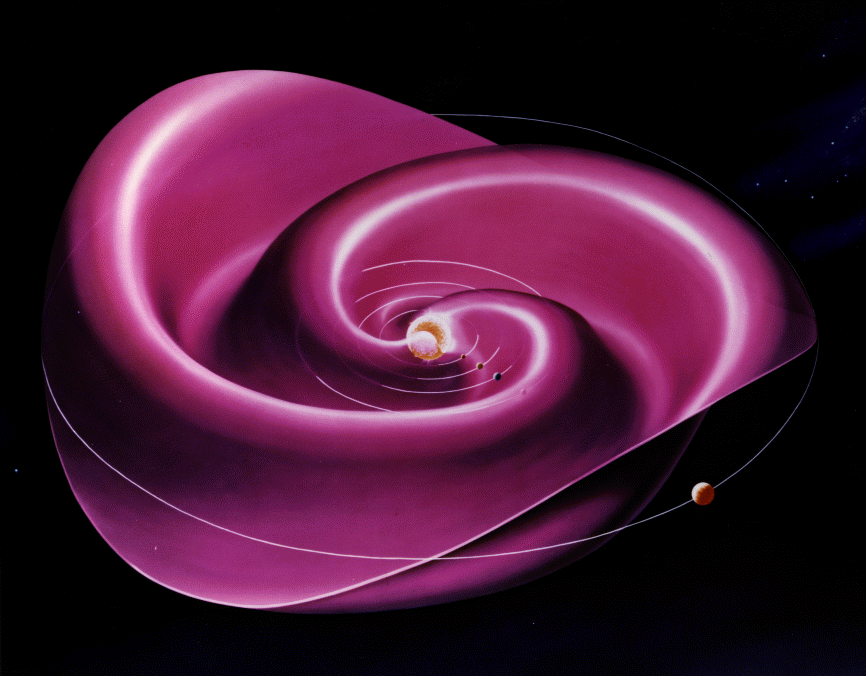
The heliospheric current sheet results from the influence of the Sun's rotating magnetic field on the plasma in the interplanetary medium.

The evolution of a current sheet during a solar flare.

A current sheet is an electric current that is confined to a surface, rather than being spread through a volume of space. Current sheets feature in magnetohydrodynamics (MHD), a model of electrically conductive fluids: if there is an electric current through part of the volume of such a fluid, magnetic forces tend to expel it from the fluid, compressing the current into thin layers that pass through the volume.

The largest occurring current sheet in the Solar System is the so-called heliospheric current sheet, which is about 10,000 km thick, and extends from the Sun and out beyond the orbit of Pluto.

In astrophysical plasmas such as the solar corona, current sheets theoretically might have an aspect ratio (breadth divided by thickness) as high as 100,000:1. By contrast, the pages of most books have an aspect ratio close to 2000:1. Because current sheets are so thin in comparison to their size, they are often treated as if they have zero thickness; this is a result of the simplifying assumptions of ideal MHD. In reality, no current sheet may be infinitely thin because that would require infinitely fast motion of the charge carriers whose motion causes the current.

Current sheets in plasmas store energy by increasing the energy density of the magnetic field. Many plasma instabilities arise near strong current sheets, which are prone to collapse, causing magnetic reconnection and rapidly releasing the stored energy. This process is the cause of solar flares and is one reason for the difficulty of magnetic confinement fusion, which requires strong electric currents in a hot plasma.

== Magnetic field of an infinite current sheet ==
An infinite current sheet can be modelled as an infinite number of parallel wires all carrying the same current. Assuming each wire carries current I, and there are N wires per unit length, the magnetic field can be derived using Ampère's law:

$$\oint_{R} \mathbf{B}\cdot\mathbf{dl} = \mu_0 I_\text{enc}$$
$$\oint_{R} B \cos(\theta) \, dl = \mu_0 I_\text{enc}$$

R is a rectangular loop surrounding the current sheet, perpendicular to the plane and perpendicular to the wires. In the two sides perpendicular to the sheet, $\mathbf{B} \cdot d\mathbf{s} = 0$ since $\cos (90^\circ) = 0$. In the other two sides, $\cos (0) = 1$, so if S is one parallel side of the rectangular loop of dimensions L × W, the integral simplifies to:
$$2\int_{S} B ds = \mu_0 I_\text{enc}$$
Since B is constant due to the chosen path, it can be pulled out of the integral:
$$2B \int_{S} ds = \mu_0 I_\text{enc}$$
The integral is evaluated:
$$2BL = \mu_0 I_\text{enc}$$
Solving for B, plugging in for I_{enc} (total current enclosed in path R) as K×N×L, and simplifying:
$$\begin{align}
B &= \frac{\mu_0 I_\text{enc}}{2L}
= \frac{\mu_0 K N L}{2L} \\[1ex]
&= \frac{\mu_0 K N}{2}
\end{align}$$
Notably, the magnetic field strength of an infinite current sheet does not depend on the distance from it.

The direction of B can be found via the right-hand rule.

== Harris sheet ==
A well-known one-dimensional current sheet equilibrium is the Harris sheet, which is a stationary solution to the Maxwell–Vlasov system. The magnetic field profile of a Harris sheet along $y = 0$ is given by
$$\mathbf{B}(y) = B_0 \tanh\left(\frac{y}{\delta}\right)\mathbf{\hat{x}},$$
where $B_0$ is the asymptotic magnetic field strength and $\delta$ provides the thickness of the current sheet. The current density is given by
$$\mathbf{J}(y) = - \frac{B_0}{\mu_0 \delta} \operatorname{sech}^2\left(\frac{y}{\delta}\right)\mathbf{\hat{z}}.$$
The plasma pressure is given by
$$p(y) = \frac{B_0^2}{2\mu_0} \operatorname{sech}^2\left(\frac{y}{\delta}\right) + p_0,$$
where $p_0$ is the asymptotic pressure.
