= Magnetic diffusion =

Type of motion of magnetic fields

Magnetic diffusion refers to the motion of magnetic fields, typically in the presence of a conducting solid or fluid such as a plasma. The motion of magnetic fields is described by the magnetic diffusion equation and is due primarily to induction and diffusion of magnetic fields through the material. The magnetic diffusion equation is a partial differential equation commonly used in physics. Understanding the phenomenon is essential to magnetohydrodynamics and has important consequences in astrophysics, geophysics, and electrical engineering.

== Equation ==
The magnetic diffusion equation (also referred to as the induction equation) is
$$\frac{\partial \mathbf{B}}{\partial t} = \nabla \times \left(\mathbf{v} \times \mathbf{B}\right) + \frac{1}{\mu_0 \sigma}\nabla^2 \mathbf{B}$$
where $\mu_0$ is the permeability of free space and $\sigma$ is the electrical conductivity of the material, which is assumed to be constant. $\mathbf{v}$ denotes the (non-relativistic) velocity of the plasma. The first term on the right hand side accounts for effects from induction of the plasma, while the second accounts for diffusion. The latter acts as a dissipation term, resulting in a loss of magnetic field energy to heat. The relative importance of the two terms is characterized by the magnetic Reynolds number, $R_m$.

In the case of a non-uniform conductivity the magnetic diffusion equation is
$$\frac{\partial \mathbf{B}}{\partial t} = \nabla \times \left(\mathbf{v} \times \mathbf{B}\right) - \frac{1}{\mu_0} \nabla \times \left(\frac{1}{\sigma} \nabla \times \mathbf{B} \right)$$
however, it becomes significantly harder to solve.

== Derivation ==
Starting from the generalized Ohm's law:
$$\mathbf{J} = \sigma \left(\mathbf{E}+\mathbf{v}\times\mathbf{B} \right)$$
and the curl equations for small displacement currents (i.e. low frequencies)
$$\begin{align}
\nabla\times\mathbf{B} &= \mu_0 \mathbf{J} + \frac{1}{c^2} \frac{\partial \mathbf{E}}{\partial t} \approx \mu_0 \mathbf{J} \\
\nabla\times\mathbf{E} &= -\frac{\partial \mathbf{B}}{\partial t}
\end{align}$$
substitute $\mathbf{J}$ into the Ampere–Maxwell law to get
$$\frac{1}{\mu_0 \sigma} \nabla\times\mathbf{B} = \mathbf{E} + \mathbf{v}\times\mathbf{B} \quad\Rightarrow\quad \mathbf{E} = \frac{1}{\mu_0 \sigma}\nabla\times\mathbf{B}-\mathbf{v}\times\mathbf{B}.$$
Taking the curl of the above equation and substituting into Faraday's law,
$$\nabla\times\mathbf{E} = \nabla\times\left(\frac{1}{\mu_0 \sigma}\nabla\times\mathbf{B} - \mathbf{v}\times\mathbf{B}\right) = -\frac{\partial \mathbf{B}}{\partial t}.$$
This expression can be simplified further by writing it in terms of the i-th component of $\mathbf{B}$ and the Levi-Civita tensor $\varepsilon_{ijk}$:
$$\begin{align}
-\frac{\partial B_i}{\partial t} & = \varepsilon_{ijk} \partial_j \left( \frac{1}{\mu_0 \sigma}\varepsilon_{klm}\partial_l B_m - \varepsilon_{klm}v_l B_m \right)\\
& = \varepsilon_{kij} \varepsilon_{klm} \left(\frac{1}{\mu_0 \sigma}\partial_j\partial_l B_m - \left(v_l \partial_j B_m + B_m \partial_j v_l \right)\right)
\end{align}$$
Using the identity $\varepsilon_{kij} \varepsilon_{klm}= \delta_{il}\delta_{jm}-\delta_{im}\delta_{jl}$ and recalling $\nabla \cdot \mathbf{B} = \partial_j B_j = 0$, the cross products can be eliminated:
$$\begin{align}
-\frac{\partial B_i}{\partial t} & = \frac{1}{\mu_0 \sigma}\left(\partial_i\partial_j B_j - \partial_j \partial_j B_i\right) - \left(v_i \partial_j B_j - v_j \partial_j B_i\right) - \left(B_j \partial_j v_i - B_i \partial_j v_j\right) \\
& = -\frac{1}{\mu_0 \sigma}\partial_j \partial_j B_i + v_j \partial_j B_i - \left(B_j \partial_j v_i - B_i \partial_j v_j\right)
\end{align}$$
Written in vector form, the final expression is
$$\begin{align}
\frac{\partial \mathbf{B}}{\partial t}+\left(\mathbf{v}\cdot\nabla\right)\mathbf{B} &= \left(\mathbf{B}\cdot\nabla\right)\mathbf{v} - \mathbf{B}\left(\nabla\cdot\mathbf{v}\right) + \frac{1}{\mu_0 \sigma}\nabla^2 \mathbf{B} \\[1ex]
\longrightarrow \quad \frac{D\mathbf{B}}{Dt} &= \left(\mathbf{B}\cdot\nabla\right)\mathbf{v} - \mathbf{B}\left(\nabla\cdot\mathbf{v}\right) + \frac{1}{\mu_0 \sigma}\nabla^2 \mathbf{B}
\end{align}$$
where $\frac{D}{Dt}=\frac{\partial}{\partial t}+\mathbf{v}\cdot\nabla$ is the material derivative. This can be rearranged into a more useful form using vector calculus identities and $\nabla \cdot \mathbf{B}=0$:
$$\frac{\partial \mathbf{B}}{\partial t}= \nabla \times (\mathbf{v} \times \mathbf{B}) + \frac{1}{\mu_0 \sigma}\nabla^2 \mathbf{B}$$
In the case $\mathbf{v}=0$, this becomes a diffusion equation for the magnetic field,
$$\frac{\partial \mathbf{B}}{\partial t} = \frac{1}{\mu_0 \sigma}\nabla^2 \mathbf{B} = \eta\nabla^2 \mathbf{B}$$
where $\eta = \frac{1}{\mu_0 \sigma}$ is the magnetic diffusivity.

== Limiting Cases ==
In some cases it is possible to neglect one of the terms in the magnetic diffusion equation. This is done by estimating the magnetic Reynolds number
$$R_m = \frac{v L}{\eta}$$
where $\eta$ is the diffusivity, $v$ is the magnitude of the plasma's velocity and $L$ is a characteristic length of the plasma.

$(R_m)$	Physical Condition	Dominating Term	Magnetic Diffusion Equation	Examples
$\gg 1$	Large electrical conductivity, large length scales or high plasma velocity.	The inductive term dominates in this case. The motion of magnetic fields is determined by the flow of the plasma. This is the case for most naturally occurring plasmas in the universe.	$\frac{\partial \mathbf{B}}{\partial t} \approx \nabla \times (\mathbf{v} \times \mathbf{B})$	The Sun $(R_m \approx 10^6)$ or the core of the earth $(R_m \approx 10^3)$
$\ll 1$	Small electrical conductivity, small length scales or low plasma velocity.	The diffusive term dominates in this case. The motion of the magnetic field obeys the typical (nonconducting) fluid diffusion equation.	$\frac{\partial \mathbf{B}}{\partial t} \approx \frac{1}{\mu_0 \sigma}\nabla^2 \mathbf{B}$	Solar flares or created in laboratories using mercury or other liquid metals.

=== Relation to Skin Effect ===
At low frequencies, the skin depth $\delta$ for the penetration of an AC electromagnetic field into a conductor is:
$$\delta = \sqrt{\frac{2}{\mu \sigma \omega}}$$
Comparing with the formula for $\eta$, the skin depth is the diffusion length of the field over one period of oscillation:
$$\delta = \sqrt{\frac{2\eta}{\omega}} = \sqrt{\frac{\eta T}{\pi}}$$

== Examples and Visualization ==
Example of magnetic field frozen into fluid flow.

For the limit $R_m \gg 1$, the magnetic field lines become "frozen in" to the motion of the conducting fluid. A simple example illustrating this behavior has a sinusoidally-varying shear flow
$$\mathbf{v} = v_0\sin(k y)\hat{\mathbf{x}}$$
with a uniform initial magnetic field $\mathbf{B}\left(\mathbf{r},0\right) = B_0\hat{\mathbf{y}}$. The equation for this limit, $\frac{\partial \mathbf{B}}{\partial t} = \nabla \times \left(\mathbf{v} \times \mathbf{B}\right)$, has the solution
$$\mathbf{B}\left(\mathbf{r},t\right) = B_0 \left(k v_0 t\cos(k y)\hat{\mathbf{x}} + \hat{\mathbf{y}}\right)$$
As can be seen in the figure to the right, the fluid drags the magnetic field lines so that they obtain the sinusoidal character of the flow field.

For the limit $R_m \ll 1$, the magnetic diffusion equation $\frac{\partial \mathbf{B}}{\partial t} = \frac{1}{\mu_0 \sigma} \nabla^2 \mathbf{B}$ is just a vector-valued form of the heat equation. For a localized initial magnetic field (e.g. Gaussian distribution) within a conducting material, the maxima and minima will asymptotically decay to a value consistent with Laplace's equation for the given boundary conditions.

== Diffusion Times for Stationary Conductors ==
For stationary conductors $(R_m=0)$ with simple geometries a time constant called magnetic diffusion time can be derived. Different one-dimensional equations apply for conducting slabs and conducting cylinders with constant magnetic permeability. Also, different diffusion time equations can be derived for nonlinear saturable materials such as steel.
