= Magnetic energy =

Energy from the work of a magnetic force

Magnetic energy is energy stored in magnetic fields and in the bonds of magnetized materials. The SI unit of magnetic energy is the Joule and the cgs unit is erg.

== Magnetic energy of rotation ==
The potential magnetic energy, $U_\text{m}$, of a magnet with a magnetic moment $\mathbf{m}$ in a magnetic field $\mathbf{B}$ is defined as the work of the magnetic force on the re-alignment of the vector of the magnetic dipole moment and is equal to:
$$U_\text{m} = -\mathbf{m} \cdot \mathbf{B}$$
The work is done by a torque $\boldsymbol{N}$:
$$\mathbf{N}=\mathbf{m}\times\mathbf{B}=-\mathbf{r}\times\mathbf{\nabla}U_\text{m}$$
which will act to "realign" the magnetic dipole with the magnetic field.

== Magnetic energy of an inductor ==
In an electronic circuit the magnetic energy, $U_\text{m}$, stored in an inductor (of inductance $L$) when a current $I$ flows through it is given by:
$$U_\text{m} = \frac{1}{2} LI^2.$$
This expression forms the basis for superconducting magnetic energy storage. It can be derived from a time average of the product of current and voltage across an inductor.

== Magnetic energy stored in magnetic fields ==
Energy is also stored in a magnetic field itself. The energy per unit volume $u$ in a region of free space with vacuum permeability $\mu _0$ containing magnetic field $\mathbf{B}$ is:
$$u = \frac{1}{2} \frac{B^2}{\mu_0}$$
More generally, if we assume that the medium is paramagnetic or diamagnetic so that a linear constitutive equation exists that relates $\mathbf{B}$ and the magnetization $\mathbf{H}$ (for example $\mathbf{H}=\mathbf{B}/\mu$ where $\mu$ is the magnetic permeability of the material), then it can be shown that the magnetic field stores an energy of
$$U_\text{m} = \frac{1}{2} \int \mathbf{H} \cdot \mathbf{B} \, \mathrm{d}V$$
where the integral is evaluated over the entire region where the magnetic field exists.

For a magnetostatic system of currents in free space, the stored energy can be found by noting that $\nabla\times\vec{H}=\vec{J}$ and $\vec{B}=\nabla\times\vec{A}$, or by imagining the process of linearly turning on the currents and their generated magnetic field, arriving at a total energy of:
$$U_\text{m} = \frac{1}{2} \int \mathbf{J} \cdot \mathbf{A}\, \mathrm{d}V$$
where $\mathbf{J}$ is the current density field and $\mathbf{A}$ is the magnetic vector potential. This is analogous to the electrostatic energy expression $\frac{1}{2}\int \rho \phi \, \mathrm{d}V$; note that neither of these static expressions apply in the case of time-varying charge or current distributions.
