= Magnetic diffusivity =

Parameter in plasma physics

The magnetic diffusivity controls the rate of magnetic field diffusion. Since its role in the evolution equation for the magnetic field is analogous to that of the viscosity for the velocity field, some authors refer to it as the 'magnetic viscosity'. The magnetic diffusivity appears in the definition of the magnetic Reynolds number. A finite value of the magnetic Reynolds number (i.e. a nonzero magnetic diffusivity) is associated with violation of Alfvén's theorem.

The magnetic diffusivity has SI units of m^{2}/s and is defined as:
$$\eta = \frac{1}{\mu_0 \sigma_0},$$
while in Gaussian units it can be defined as
$$\eta = \frac{c^2}{4\pi\sigma_0}.$$
In the above, $\mu_0$ is the permeability of free space, $c$ is the speed of light, and $\sigma_0$ is the electrical conductivity of the material in question. In case of a plasma, this is the conductivity due to Coulomb or neutral collisions: $\sigma_0 = \frac{n_e e^2}{m_e\nu_c}$, where

- $n_e$ is the electron density.
- $e$ is the electron charge.
- $m_e$ is the electron mass.
- $\nu_c$ is the collision frequency.

== See also ==
- Electrical resistivity and conductivity
