= Magnetic pressure =

Energy density associated with a magnetic field

Gradients in magnetic field strength result in a magnetic pressure force perpendicular to the magnetic field in the direction of decreasing magnetic field strength.

In physics, magnetic pressure is an energy density associated with a magnetic field. In SI units, the energy density $P_B$ of a magnetic field with strength $B$ can be expressed as
$$P_B = \frac{B^2}{2\mu_0}$$
where $\mu_0$ is the vacuum permeability.

Any magnetic field has an associated magnetic pressure contained by the boundary conditions on the field. It is identical to any other physical pressure except that it is carried by the magnetic field rather than (in the case of a gas) by the kinetic energy of gas molecules. A gradient in field strength causes a force due to the magnetic pressure gradient called the magnetic pressure force.

== Mathematical statement ==
In SI units, the magnetic pressure $P_B$ in a magnetic field of strength $B$ is
$$P_B = \frac{B^2}{2\mu_0}$$
where $\mu_0$ is the vacuum permeability and $P_B$ has units of energy density.

=== Magnetic pressure force ===
In ideal magnetohydrodynamics (MHD) the magnetic pressure force in an electrically conducting fluid with a bulk plasma velocity field $\mathbf{v}$, current density $\mathbf{J}$, mass density $\rho$, magnetic field $\mathbf{B}$, and plasma pressure $p$ can be derived from the Cauchy momentum equation:
$$\rho\left(\frac{\partial}{\partial t} + \mathbf{v} \cdot \nabla\right)\mathbf{v} = \mathbf{J}\times\mathbf{B} - \nabla p,$$
where the first term on the right hand side represents the Lorentz force and the second term represents pressure gradient forces. The Lorentz force can be expanded using Ampère's law, $\mu_0\mathbf{J} = \nabla \times \mathbf{B}$, and the vector identity
$$\tfrac12\nabla(\mathbf{B}\cdot \mathbf{B})=(\mathbf{B}\cdot\nabla)\mathbf{B}+\mathbf{B}\times(\nabla\times \mathbf{B})$$
to give
$$\mathbf{J} \times \mathbf{B} = {(\mathbf{B} \cdot \nabla)\mathbf{B} \over \mu_0} - \nabla\left(\frac{B^2}{2\mu_0}\right),$$
where the first term on the right hand side is the magnetic tension and the second term is the magnetic pressure force.

Magnetic tension and pressure are both implicitly included in the Maxwell stress tensor. Terms representing these two forces are present along the main diagonal where they act on differential area elements normal to the corresponding axis.

== Wire loops ==
The magnetic pressure force is readily observed in an unsupported loop of wire. If an electric current passes through the loop, the wire serves as an electromagnet, such that the magnetic field strength inside the loop is much greater than the field strength just outside the loop. This gradient in field strength gives rise to a magnetic pressure force that tends to stretch the wire uniformly outward. If enough current travels through the wire, the loop of wire will form a circle. At even higher currents, the magnetic pressure can create tensile stress that exceeds the tensile strength of the wire, causing it to fracture, or even explosively fragment. Thus, management of magnetic pressure is a significant challenge in the design of ultrastrong electromagnets.

The force (in cgs) F exerted on a coil by its own current is

$$\mathbf{F} =\dfrac{I^2}{c^2R} \left[\ln\left(\dfrac{8R}{a}\right) - 1 + Y\right]$$

where Y is the internal inductance of the coil, defined by the distribution of current. Y is 0 for high frequency currents carried mostly by the outer surface of the conductor, and 0.25 for DC currents distributed evenly throughout the conductor. See inductance for more information.

Interplay between magnetic pressure and ordinary gas pressure is important to magnetohydrodynamics and plasma physics. Magnetic pressure can also be used to propel projectiles; this is the operating principle of a railgun.

== Force-free fields ==
When all electric currents present in a conducting fluid are parallel to the magnetic field, the magnetic pressure gradient and magnetic tension force are balanced, and the Lorentz force vanishes. If non-magnetic forces are also neglected, the field configuration is referred to as force-free. Furthermore, if the current density is zero, the magnetic field is the gradient of a magnetic scalar potential, and the field is subsequently referred to as potential.

== See also ==
- Magnetic tension force
- Maxwell stress tensor
- Electromagnetically induced acoustic noise and vibration
- Alfvén wave
