= Induction equation =

Concept in magnetohydrodynamics

In magnetohydrodynamics, the induction equation is a partial differential equation that relates the magnetic field and velocity of an electrically conductive fluid such as a plasma. It can be derived from Maxwell's equations and Ohm's law, and plays a major role in plasma physics and astrophysics, especially in dynamo theory.

== Mathematical statement ==
Maxwell's equations describing the Faraday's and Ampere's laws read:
$$\nabla \times \mathbf{E}= -\frac{\partial \mathbf{B}}{\partial t},$$
and
$$\nabla \times \mathbf{B} = \mu_0\mathbf{J},$$
where:

- $\mathbf{E}$ is the electric field.
- $\mathbf{B}$ is the magnetic field.
- $\mu_0$ is the vacuum permeability.
- $\mathbf{J}$ is the electric current density.

The displacement current can be neglected in a plasma as it is negligible compared to the current carried by the free charges. The only exception to this is for exceptionally high frequency phenomena: for example, for a plasma with a typical electrical conductivity of 10^{7} mho/m, the displacement current is smaller than the free current by a factor of 10^{3} for frequencies below 2×10^{14} Hz.

The electric field can be related to the current density using the Ohm's law:
$$\mathbf{E} + \mathbf{v}\times\mathbf{B} = \mathbf{J}/\sigma$$
where

- $\mathbf{v}$ is the velocity field.
- $\sigma$ is the electric conductivity of the fluid.

Combining these three equations, eliminating $\mathbf{E}$ and $\mathbf{J}$, yields the induction equation for an electrically resistive fluid:
$${\partial \mathbf{B} \over \partial t} = \eta \nabla^2 \mathbf{B} + \nabla \times \left(\mathbf{v} \times \mathbf{B}\right).$$

Here $\eta = 1 / \mu_0\sigma$ is the magnetic diffusivity (in the literature, the electrical resistivity, defined as $1 / \sigma$, is often identified with the magnetic diffusivity).

If the fluid moves with a typical speed $V$ and a typical length scale $L$, then
$$\begin{align}
\eta \nabla^2 \mathbf{B} &\sim \frac{\eta B}{L^2}, \\
\nabla \times \left(\mathbf{v}\times \mathbf{B}\right) &\sim \frac{VB}{L}.
\end{align}$$

The ratio of these quantities, which is a dimensionless parameter, is called the magnetic Reynolds number:
$$R_m = \frac{LV}{\eta}.$$

== Perfectly-conducting limit ==
For a fluid with infinite electric conductivity, $\eta \to 0$, the first term in the induction equation vanishes. This is equivalent to a very large magnetic Reynolds number. For example, it can be of order 10^{9} in a typical star. In this case, the fluid can be called a perfect or ideal fluid. So, the induction equation for an ideal conductive fluid such as most astrophysical plasmas is
$${\partial \mathbf{B} \over \partial t} = \nabla\times(\mathbf{v}\times\mathbf{B}).$$

This is taken to be a good approximation in dynamo theory, used to explain the magnetic field evolution in the astrophysical environments such as stars, galaxies and accretion discs.

== Convective limit ==
More generally, the equation for the perfectly-conducting limit applies in regions of large spatial scale rather than infinite electric conductivity, (i.e., $\eta \to 0$), as this also makes the magnetic Reynolds number very large such that the diffusion term can be neglected. This limit is called "ideal-MHD" and its most important theorem is Alfvén's theorem (also called the frozen-in flux theorem).

== Diffusive limit ==
For very small magnetic Reynolds numbers, the diffusive term overcomes the convective term. For example, in an electrically resistive fluid with large values of $\eta$, the magnetic field is diffused away very fast, and the Alfvén's Theorem cannot be applied. This means magnetic energy is dissipated to heat and other types of energy. The induction equation then reads
$${\partial \mathbf{B} \over \partial t} = \eta \nabla^2 \mathbf{B}.$$

It is common to define a dissipation time scale $\tau_d = L^2/\eta$ which is the time scale for the dissipation of magnetic energy over a length scale $L$.

== See also ==
- Alfvén's Theorem
- Magnetohydrodynamics
- Maxwell's equations
