= Magnetic Reynolds number =

Dimensionless quantity in magnetohydrodynamics

In magnetohydrodynamics, the magnetic Reynolds number (R_{m}) is a dimensionless quantity that estimates the relative effects of advection or induction of a magnetic field by the motion of a conducting medium to the magnetic diffusion. It is the magnetic analogue of the Reynolds number in fluid mechanics and is typically defined by:
$$\mathrm{R}_\mathrm{m} = \frac{U L}{\eta} ~~ \sim \frac{\mathrm{induction}}{\mathrm{diffusion}}$$
where

- $U$ is a typical velocity of the flow,
- $L$ is a typical length scale of the flow,
- $\eta$ is the magnetic diffusivity.

The mechanism by which the motion of a conducting fluid generates a magnetic field is the subject of dynamo theory. When the magnetic Reynolds number is very large, however, diffusion and the dynamo are less of a concern, and in this case focus instead often rests on the influence of the magnetic field on the flow.

== Derivation ==
In the theory of magnetohydrodynamics, the magnetic Reynolds number can be derived from the induction equation:
$$\frac{\partial \mathbf{B}}{\partial t} = \nabla  \times (\mathbf{u}  \times \mathbf{B}) + \eta \nabla^2 \mathbf{B}$$
where

- $\mathbf{B}$ is the magnetic field,
- $\mathbf{u}$ is the fluid velocity,
- $\eta$ is the magnetic diffusivity.

The first term on the right hand side accounts for effects from magnetic induction in the plasma and the second term accounts for effects from magnetic diffusion. The relative importance of these two terms can be found by taking their ratio, the magnetic Reynolds number $\mathrm{R}_\mathrm{m}$. If it is assumed that both terms share the scale length $L$ such that $\nabla \sim 1/L$ and the scale velocity $U$ such that $\mathbf{u} \sim U$, the induction term can be written as
$$\nabla  \times (\mathbf{u}  \times \mathbf{B}) \sim \frac{UB}{L}$$
and the diffusion term as
$$\eta \nabla^2 \mathbf{B} \sim \frac{\eta B}{L^2}.$$
The ratio of the two terms is therefore
$$\mathrm{R}_\mathrm{m} = \frac{UL}{\eta}.$$

== General characteristics for large and small R_{m} ==
For $\mathrm{R}_\mathrm{m} \ll 1$, advection is relatively unimportant, and so the magnetic field will tend to relax towards a purely diffusive state, determined by the boundary conditions rather than the flow.

For $\mathrm{R}_\mathrm{m} \gg 1$, diffusion is relatively unimportant on the length scale L. Flux lines of the magnetic field are then advected with the fluid flow, until such time as gradients are concentrated into regions of short enough length scale that diffusion can balance advection.

== Range of values ==
The Sun has a large $\mathrm{R}_\mathrm{m}$, of order 10^{6}. Dissipative effects are generally small, and there is no difficulty in maintaining a magnetic field against diffusion.

For the Earth, $\mathrm{R}_\mathrm{m}$ is estimated to be of order 10^{3}. Dissipation is more significant, but a magnetic field is supported by motion in the liquid iron outer core. There are other bodies in the Solar System that have working dynamos, e.g. Jupiter, Saturn, and Mercury, and others that do not, e.g. Mars, Venus and the Moon.

The human length scale is very small so that typically $\mathrm{R}_\mathrm{m} \ll 1$. The generation of magnetic field by the motion of a conducting fluid has been achieved in only a handful of large experiments using mercury or liquid sodium.

== Bounds ==
In situations where permanent magnetisation is not possible, e.g. above the Curie temperature, to maintain a magnetic field $\mathrm{R}_\mathrm{m}$ must be large enough such that induction outweighs diffusion. It is not the absolute magnitude of velocity that is important for induction, but rather the relative differences and shearing in the flow, which stretch and fold magnetic field lines. A more appropriate form for the magnetic Reynolds number in this case is therefore
$$\hat{\mathrm{R}}_\mathrm{m} = \frac{L^2 S}{\eta}$$
where S is a measure of strain. One of the most well known results is due to Backus which states that the minimum $\mathrm{R}_\mathrm{m}$ for generation of a magnetic field by flow in a sphere is such that
$$\hat{\mathrm{R}}_\mathrm{m} \ge \pi^2$$
where $L=a$ is the radius of the sphere and $S = e_{\max}$ is the maximum strain rate. This bound has since been improved by approximately 25% by Proctor.

Many studies of the generation of magnetic field by a flow consider the computationally-convenient periodic cube. In this case the minimum is found to be
$$\mathrm{\hat{R}}_\mathrm{m} = 2.48$$
where $S$ is the root-mean-square strain over a scaled domain with sides of length $2\pi$. If shearing over small length scales in the cube is ruled out, then $\mathrm{R}_\mathrm{m} = 1.73$ is the minimum, where $U$ is the root-mean-square value.

== Relationship to Reynolds number and Péclet number ==
The magnetic Reynolds number has a similar form to both the Péclet number and the Reynolds number. All three can be regarded as giving the ratio of advective to diffusive effects for a particular physical field and have the form of the product of a velocity and a length divided by a diffusivity. While the magnetic Reynolds number is related to the magnetic field in a magnetohydrodynamic flow, the Reynolds number is related to the fluid velocity itself and the Péclet number is related to heat. The dimensionless groups arise in the non-dimensionalization of the respective governing equations: the induction equation, the Navier–Stokes equations, and the heat equation.

== Relationship to eddy current braking ==
The dimensionless magnetic Reynolds number, $\mathrm{R}_\mathrm{m}$, is also used in cases where there is no physical fluid involved.
$$\mathrm{R}_\mathrm{m} = \mu \sigma L U$$
where

- $\mu$ is the magnetic permeability,
- $\sigma$ is the electrical conductivity,
- $L$ is the characteristic length of the system, and
- $U$ is the characteristic velocity of the system.

For $\mathrm{R}_\mathrm{m} < 1$ the skin effect is negligible and the eddy current braking torque follows the theoretical curve of an induction motor.

For $\mathrm{R}_\mathrm{m} > 30$ the skin effect dominates and the braking torque decreases much slower with increasing speed than predicted by the induction motor model.

== See also ==
- Lundquist number
- Magnetohydrodynamics
- Alfvén Mach number
- Reynolds number
- Péclet number
