= Magnetosphere of Saturn =

Cavity in the solar wind created by Saturn

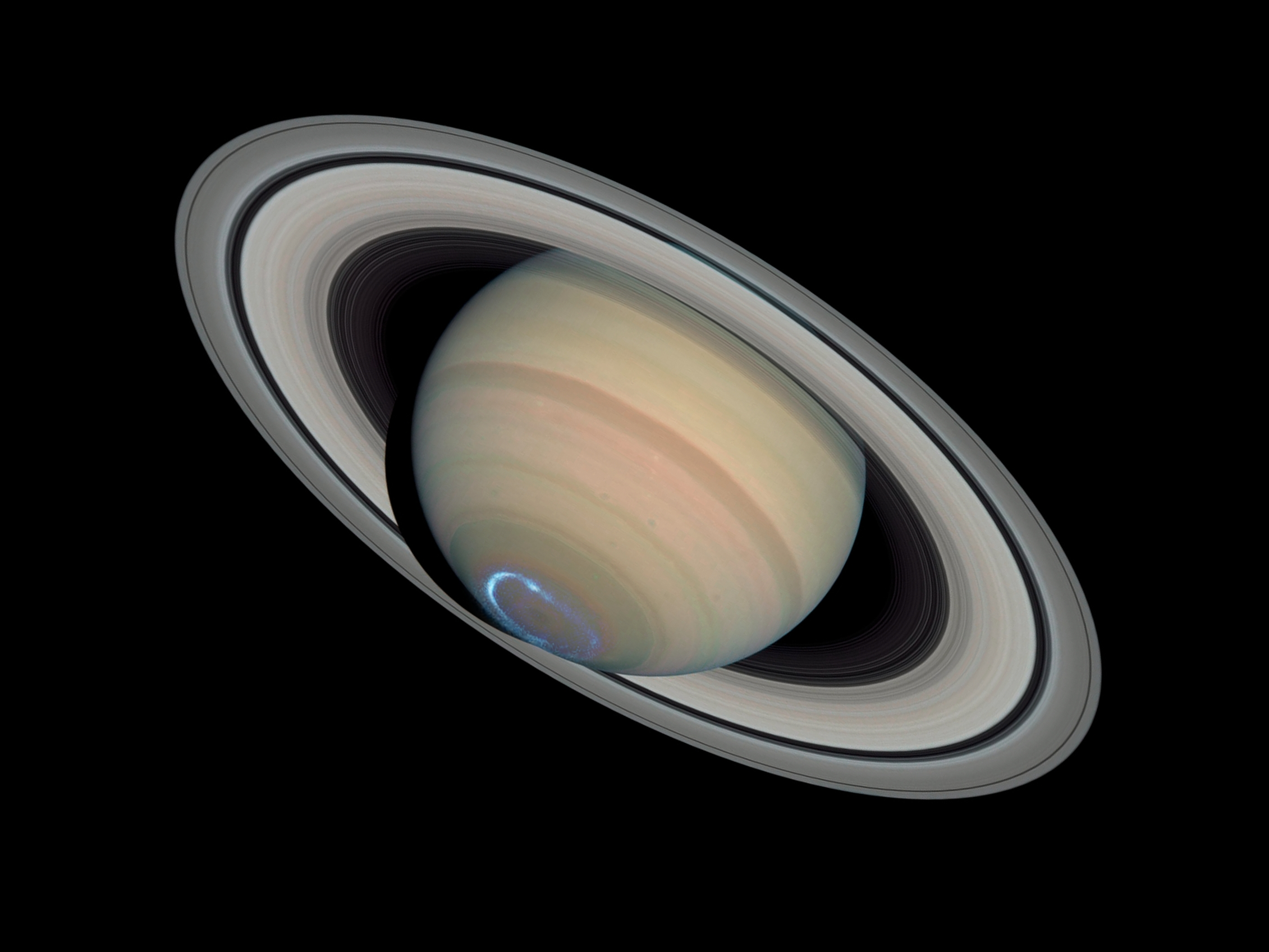
- Aurorae on the south pole of Saturn as viewed by Hubble

Discovery

Internal field
- Radius of Saturn: 60,330 km
- Equatorial field strength: 21 μT (0.21 G)
- Dipole tilt: <0.5°
- Rotation period: ?

Solar wind parameters
- Speed: 400 km/s
- IMF strength: 0.5 nT
- Density: 0.1 cm^{−3}

Magnetospheric parameters
- Type: Intrinsic
- Bow shock distance: ~27 R_{s}
- Magnetopause distance: ~22 R_{s}
- Main ions: O^{+}, H_{2}O^{+}, OH^{+}, H_{3}O^{+}, HO_{2}^{+} and O_{2}^{+} and H^{+}
- Plasma sources: Enceladus
- Mass loading rate: ~100 kg/s
- Maximum plasma density: 50–100 cm^{−3}

Aurora
- Spectrum: radio, near-IR and UV
- Total power: 0.5 TW
- Radio emission frequencies: 10–1300 kHz

The magnetosphere of Saturn is the cavity created in the flow of the solar wind by the planet's internally generated magnetic field. Discovered in 1979 by the Pioneer 11 spacecraft, Saturn's magnetosphere is the second largest of any planet in the Solar System after Jupiter's. The magnetopause, the boundary between Saturn's magnetosphere and the solar wind, is located at a distance of about 20 Saturn radii from the planet's center, while its magnetotail stretches hundreds of Saturn radii behind it.

Saturn's magnetosphere is filled with plasmas originating from both the planet and its moons. The main source is the small moon Enceladus, which ejects as much as 1,000 kg/s of water vapor from the geysers on its south pole, a portion of which is ionized and forced to co-rotate with the Saturn's magnetic field. This loads the field with as much as 100 kg of water group ions per second. This plasma gradually moves out from the inner magnetosphere via the interchange instability mechanism and then escapes through the magnetotail.

The interaction between Saturn's magnetosphere and the solar wind generates bright oval aurorae around the planet's poles observed in visible, infrared and ultraviolet light. The aurorae are related to the powerful saturnian kilometric radiation (SKR), which spans the frequency interval between 100 kHz to 1300 kHz and was once thought to modulate with a period equal to the planet's rotation. However, later measurements showed that the periodicity of the SKR's modulation varies by as much as 1%, and so probably does not exactly coincide with Saturn's true rotational period, which as of 2010 remains unknown. Inside the magnetosphere there are radiation belts, which house particles with energy as high as tens of megaelectronvolts. The energetic particles have significant influence on the surfaces of inner icy moons of Saturn.

In 1980–1981 the magnetosphere of Saturn was studied by the Voyager spacecraft. Up until September 2017 it was a subject of ongoing investigation by Cassini mission, which arrived in 2004 and spent over 13 years observing the planet.

== Discovery ==
Immediately after the discovery of Jupiter's decametric radio emissions in 1955, attempts were made to detect a similar emission from Saturn, but with inconclusive results. The first evidence that Saturn might have an internally generated magnetic field came in 1974, with the detection of weak radio emissions from the planet at the frequency of about 1 MHz.

These medium wave emissions were modulated with a period of about 10 h 30 min, which was interpreted as Saturn's rotation period. Nevertheless, the evidence available in the 1970s was too inconclusive and some scientists thought that Saturn might lack a magnetic field altogether, while others even speculated that the planet could lie beyond the heliopause. The first definite detection of the saturnian magnetic field was made only on September 1, 1979, when it was passed through by the Pioneer 11 spacecraft, which measured its magnetic field strength directly.

== Structure ==
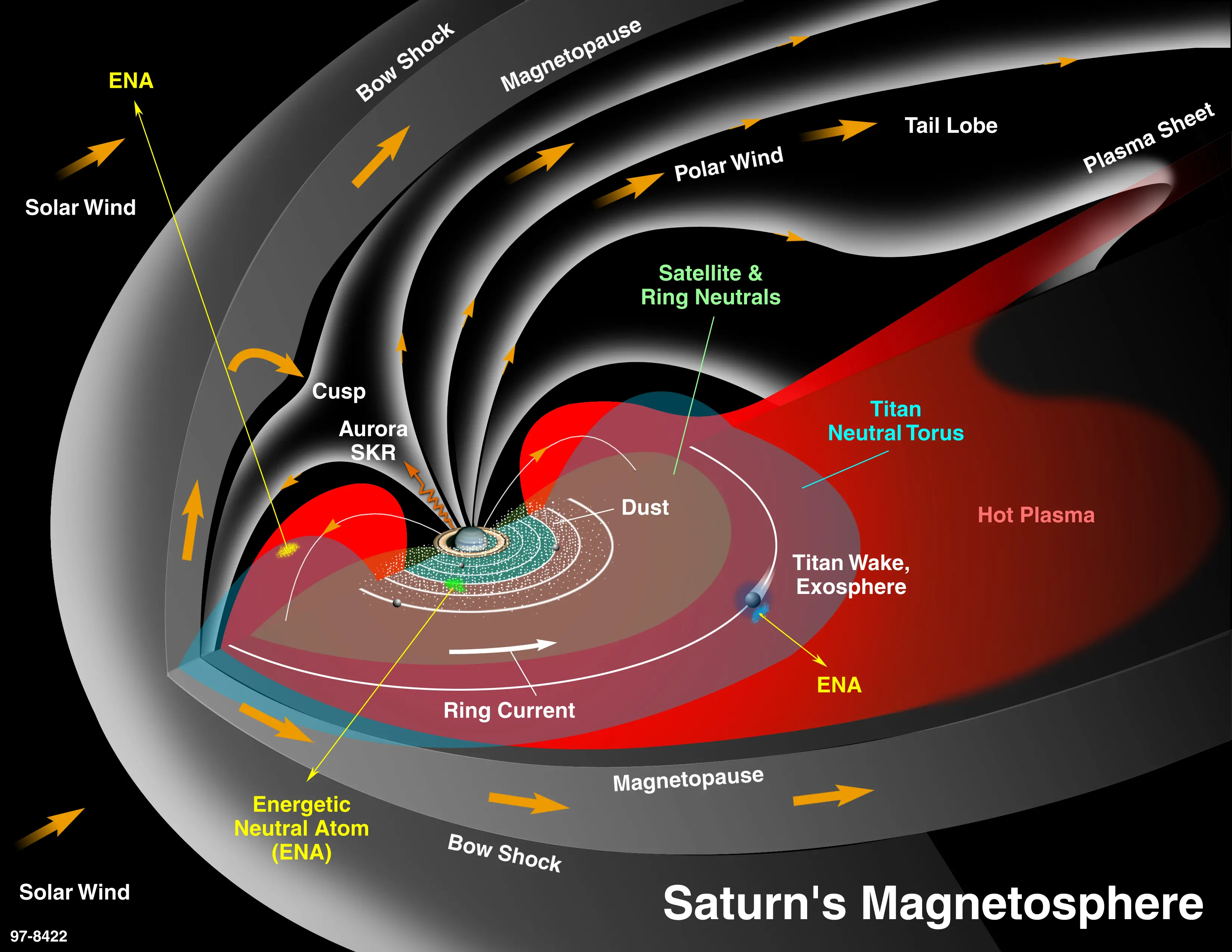
Saturn's magnetosphere

=== Internal field ===
Like Jupiter's magnetic field, Saturn's is created by a fluid dynamo within a layer of circulating liquid metallic hydrogen in its outer core. Like Earth, Saturn's magnetic field is mostly a dipole, with north and south poles at the ends of a single magnetic axis. On Saturn, like on Jupiter, the north magnetic pole is located in the northern hemisphere, and the south magnetic pole lies in the southern hemisphere, so that magnetic field lines point away from the north pole and towards the south pole. This is reversed compared to the Earth, where the north magnetic pole lies in the southern hemisphere. Saturn's magnetic field also has quadrupole, octupole and higher components, though they are much weaker than the dipole.

The magnetic field strength at Saturn's equator is about 21 μT (0.21 G), which corresponds to a dipole magnetic moment of about 4.6 × 10^{18} T•m^{3}. This makes Saturn's magnetic field slightly weaker than Earth's; however, its magnetic moment is about 580 times larger. Saturn's magnetic dipole is strictly aligned with its rotational axis, meaning that the field, uniquely, is highly axisymmetric. The dipole is slightly shifted (by 0.037 R_{s}) along Saturn's rotational axis towards the north pole.

=== Size and shape ===
Saturn's internal magnetic field deflects the solar wind, a stream of ionized particles emitted by the Sun, away from its surface, preventing it from interacting directly with its atmosphere and instead creating its own region, called a magnetosphere, composed of a plasma very different from that of the solar wind. The magnetosphere of Saturn is the second–largest magnetosphere in the Solar System after that of Jupiter.

As with Earth's magnetosphere, the boundary separating the solar wind's plasma from that within Saturn's magnetosphere is called the magnetopause. The magnetopause distance from the planet's center at the subsolar point (Note: The subsolar point is a point on a planet, never fixed, at which the Sun appears directly overhead.) varies widely from 16 to 27 R_{s} (R_{s}=60,330 km is the equatorial radius of Saturn). The magnetopause's position depends on the pressure exerted by the solar wind, which in turn depends on solar activity. The average magnetopause standoff distance is about 22 R_{s}. In front of the magnetopause (at the distance of about 27 R_{s} from the planet) lies the bow shock, a wake-like disturbance in the solar wind caused by its collision with the magnetosphere. The region between the bow shock and magnetopause is called the magnetosheath.

At the opposite side of the planet, the solar wind stretches Saturn's magnetic field lines into a long, trailing magnetotail, which consists of two lobes, with the magnetic field in the northern lobe pointing away from Saturn and the southern pointing towards it. The lobes are separated by a thin layer of plasma called the tail current sheet. Like Earth's, Saturn's tail is a channel through which solar plasma enters the inner regions of the magnetosphere. Similar to Jupiter, the tail is the conduit through which the plasma of the internal magnetospheric origin leaves the magnetosphere. The plasma moving from the tail to the inner magnetosphere is heated and forms a number of radiation belts.

=== Magnetospheric regions ===
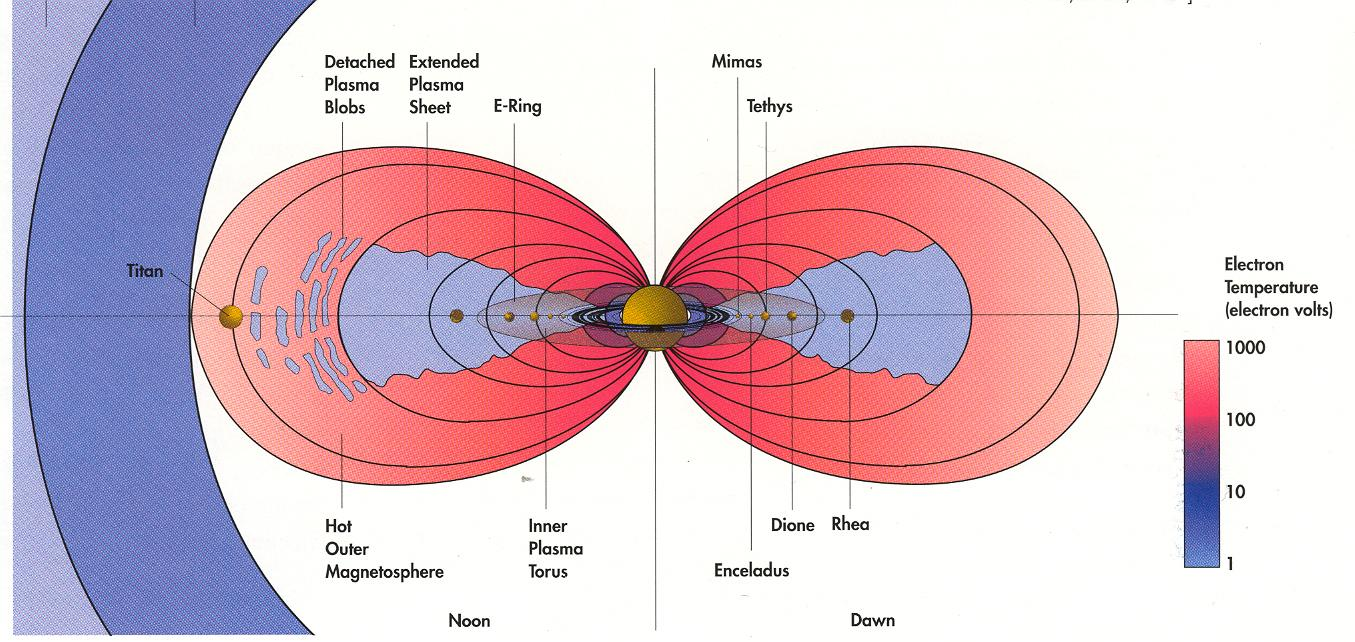
The structure of Saturn's magnetosphere

Saturn's magnetosphere is often divided into four regions. The innermost region co-located with Saturn's planetary rings, inside approximately 3 R_{s}, has a strictly dipolar magnetic field. It is largely devoid of plasma, which is absorbed by ring particles, although the radiation belts of Saturn are located in this innermost region just inside and outside the rings. The second region between 3 and 6 R_{s} contains the cold plasma torus and is called the inner magnetosphere. It contains the densest plasma in the saturnian system. The plasma in the torus originates from the inner icy moons and particularly from Enceladus. The magnetic field in this region is also mostly dipolar. The third region lies between 6 and 12–14 R_{s} and is called the dynamic and extended plasma sheet. The magnetic field in this region is stretched and non-dipolar, whereas the plasma is confined to a thin equatorial plasma sheet. The fourth outermost region is located beyond 15 R_{s} at high latitudes and continues up to magnetopause boundary. It is characterized by a low plasma density and a variable, non-dipolar magnetic field strongly influenced by the Solar wind.

In the outer parts of Saturn's magnetosphere beyond approximately 15–20 R_{s} the magnetic field near the equatorial plane is highly stretched and forms a disk-like structure called magnetodisk. The disk continues up to the magnetopause on the dayside and transitions into the magnetotail on the nightside. Near the dayside it can be absent when the magnetosphere is compressed by the Solar wind, which usually happens when the magnetopause distance is smaller than 23 R_{s}. On the nightside and flanks of the magnetosphere the magnetodisk is always present. The Saturnian magnetodisk is a much smaller analog of the Jovian magnetodisk.

The plasma sheet in Saturn's magnetosphere has a bowl-like shape not found in any other known magnetosphere. When Cassini arrived in 2004, there was a winter in the northern hemisphere. The measurements of the magnetic field and plasma density revealed that the plasma sheet was warped and lay to the north of the equatorial plane, looking like a giant bowl. Such a shape was unexpected.

== Dynamics ==
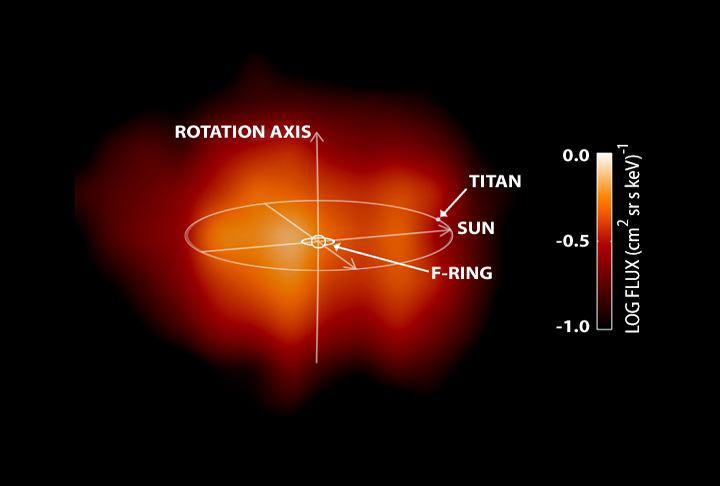
Image of plasma cloud around Saturn (Cassini)

The processes driving Saturn's magnetosphere are similar to those driving Earth's and Jupiter's. Just as Jupiter's magnetosphere is dominated by plasma co–rotation and mass–loading from Io, so Saturn's magnetosphere is dominated by plasma co–rotation and mass–loading from Enceladus. However, Saturn's magnetosphere is much smaller in size, while its inner region contains too little plasma to seriously distend it and create a large magnetodisk. (Note: On the dayside a noticeable magnetodisk only forms when the Solar wind pressure is low, and the magnetosphere has a size larger than about 23 R_{s}. However, when the magnetosphere is compressed by the Solar wind the dayside magnetodisk is quite small. On the other hand, in the dawn sector of the magnetosphere the disk-like configuration is present permanently.) This means that it is much more strongly influenced by the solar wind, and that, like Earth's magnetic field, its dynamics are affected by reconnection with the wind similar to the Dungey cycle.

Another distinguishing feature of Saturn's magnetosphere is high abundance of neutral gas around the planet. As revealed by ultraviolet observation of Cassini, the planet is enshrouded in a large cloud of hydrogen, water vapor and their dissociative products like hydroxyl, extending as far as 45 R_{s} from Saturn. In the inner magnetosphere the ratio of neutrals to ions is around 60 and it increases in the outer magnetosphere, which means that the entire magnetospheric volume is filled with relatively dense weakly ionized gas. This is different, for instance, from Jupiter or Earth, where ions dominate over neutral gas, and has consequences for the magnetospheric dynamics.

=== Sources and transport of plasma ===
The plasma composition in Saturn's inner magnetosphere is dominated by the water group ions: O^{+}, H_{2}O^{+}, OH^{+} and others, hydronium ion (H_{3}O^{+}), HO_{2}^{+} and O_{2}^{+}, although protons and nitrogen ions (N^{+}) are also present. The main source of water is Enceladus, which releases 300–600 kg/s of water vapor from the geysers near its south pole. The released water and hydroxyl (OH) radicals (a product of water's dissociation) form a rather thick torus around the moon's orbit at 4 R_{s} with densities up to 10,000 molecules per cubic centimeter. At least 100 kg/s of this water is eventually ionized and added to the co–rotating magnetospheric plasma. Additional sources of water group ions are Saturn's rings and other icy moons. The Cassini spacecraft also observed small amounts of N^{+} ions in the inner magnetosphere, which probably originate from Enceladus as well.

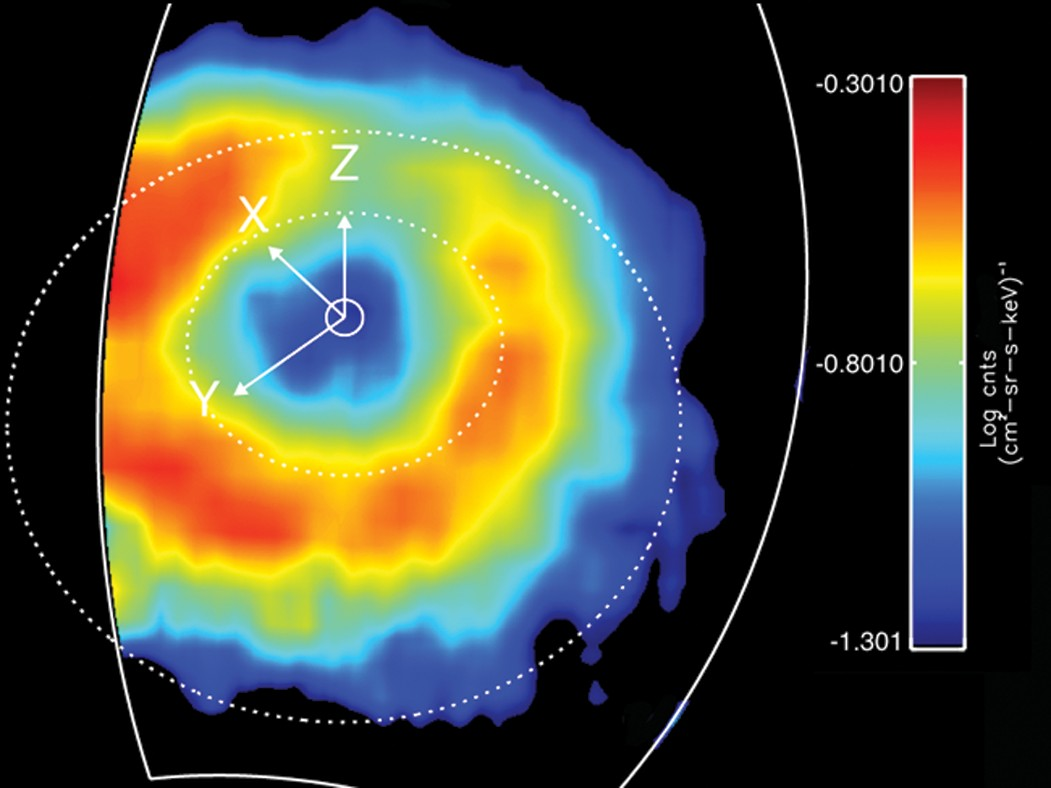
Cassini image of the ring current around Saturn carried by energetic (20–50 keV) ions

In the outer parts of the magnetosphere the dominant ions are protons, which originate either from the Solar wind or Saturn's ionosphere. Titan, which orbits close to the magnetopause boundary at 20 R_{s}, is not a significant source of plasma.

The relatively cold plasma in the innermost region of Saturn's magnetosphere, inside 3 R_{s} (near the rings) consists mainly of O^{+} and O_{2}^{+} ions. There ions together with electrons form an ionosphere surrounding the saturnian rings.

For both Jupiter and Saturn, transport of plasma from the inner to the outer parts of the magnetosphere is thought to be related to interchange instability. In the case of Saturn, charge exchange facilitates the transfer of energy from the previously hot ions to the neutral gases in the inner magnetosphere. Then, magnetic flux tubes loaded with this newly cold, water–rich plasma interchange with flux tubes filled with hot plasma arriving from the outer magnetosphere. The instability is driven by centrifugal force exerted by the plasma on the magnetic field. The cold plasma is eventually removed from the magnetosphere by plasmoids formed when the magnetic field reconnects in the magnetotail. The plasmoids move down the tail and escape from the magnetosphere. The reconnection or substorm process is thought to be under the control of the solar wind and Saturn's largest moon Titan, which orbits near the outer boundary of the magnetosphere.

In the magnetodisk region, beyond 6 R_{s}, the plasma within the co–rotating sheet exerts a significant centrifugal force on the magnetic field, causing it to stretch. (Note: The contribution of the plasma thermal pressure gradient force may also be significant. In addition, an important contribution to the ring current is provided by energetic ions with energy of more than about 10 keV.) This interaction creates a current in the equatorial plane flowing azimuthally with rotation and extending as far as 20 R_{s} from the planet. The total strength of this current varies from 8 to 17 MA. The ring current in the saturnian magnetosphere is highly variable and depends on the solar wind pressure, being stronger when the pressure is weaker. The magnetic moment associated with this current slightly (by about 10 nT) depresses the magnetic field in the inner magnetosphere, although it increases the total magnetic moment of the planet and causing the size of the magnetosphere to become larger.

=== Aurorae ===
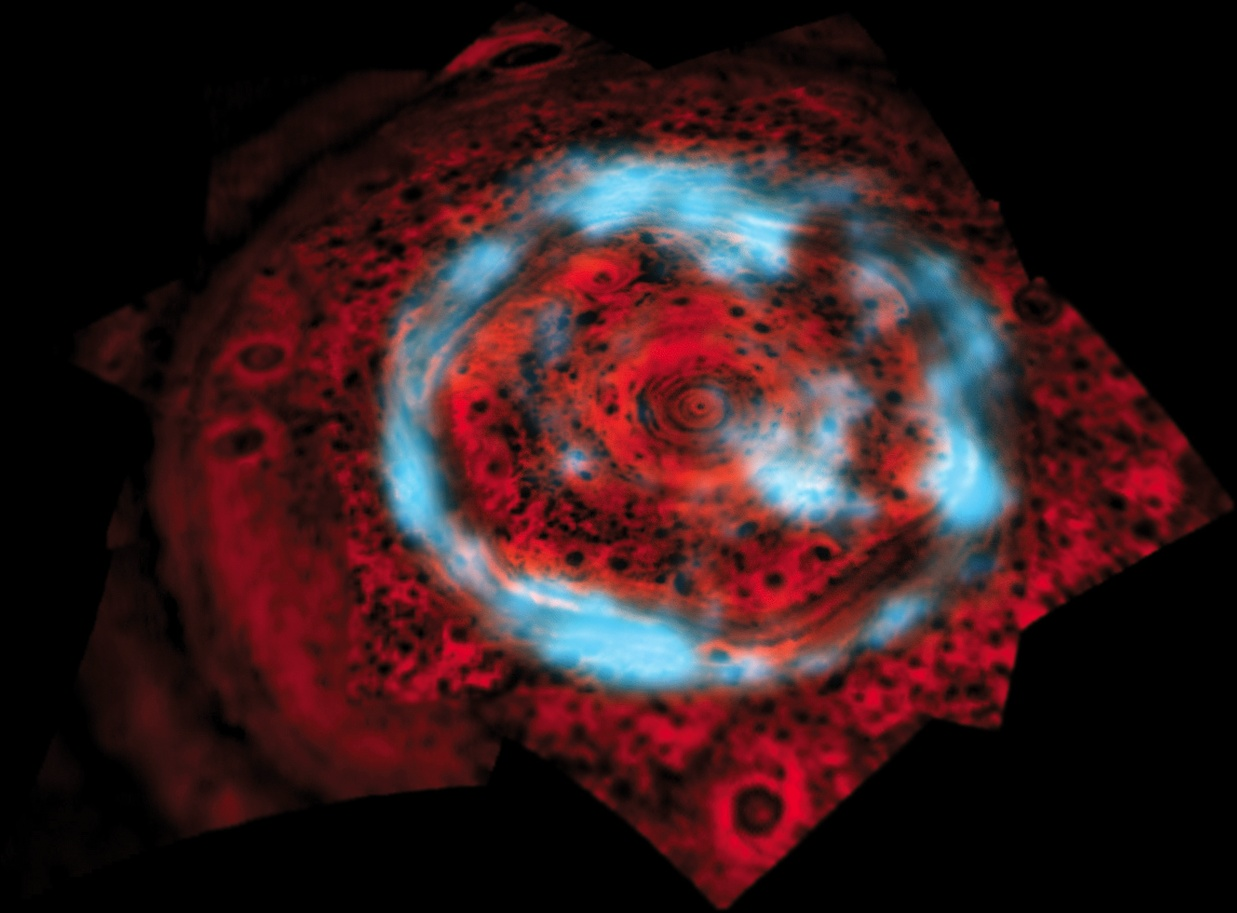
The northern aurora of Saturn in the infrared light

Saturn has bright polar aurorae, which have been observed in the ultraviolet, visible and near infrared light. The aurorae usually look like bright continuous circles (ovals) surrounding the poles of the planet. The latitude of auroral ovals varies in the range of 70–80°; the average position is 75 ± 1° for the southern aurora, while the northern aurora is closer to the pole by about 1.5°. (Note: The difference between the southern and northern aurorae is related to the shift of the internal magnetic dipole to the northern hemisphere—the magnetic field in the northern hemisphere is slightly stronger than in the southern one.) From time to time either aurorae can assume a spiral shape instead of oval. In this case it begins near midnight at a latitude of around 80°, then its latitude decreases to as low as 70° as it continues into the dawn and day sectors (counterclockwise). In the dusk sector the auroral latitude increases again, although when it returns to the night sector it still has a relatively low latitude and does not connect to the brighter dawn part.

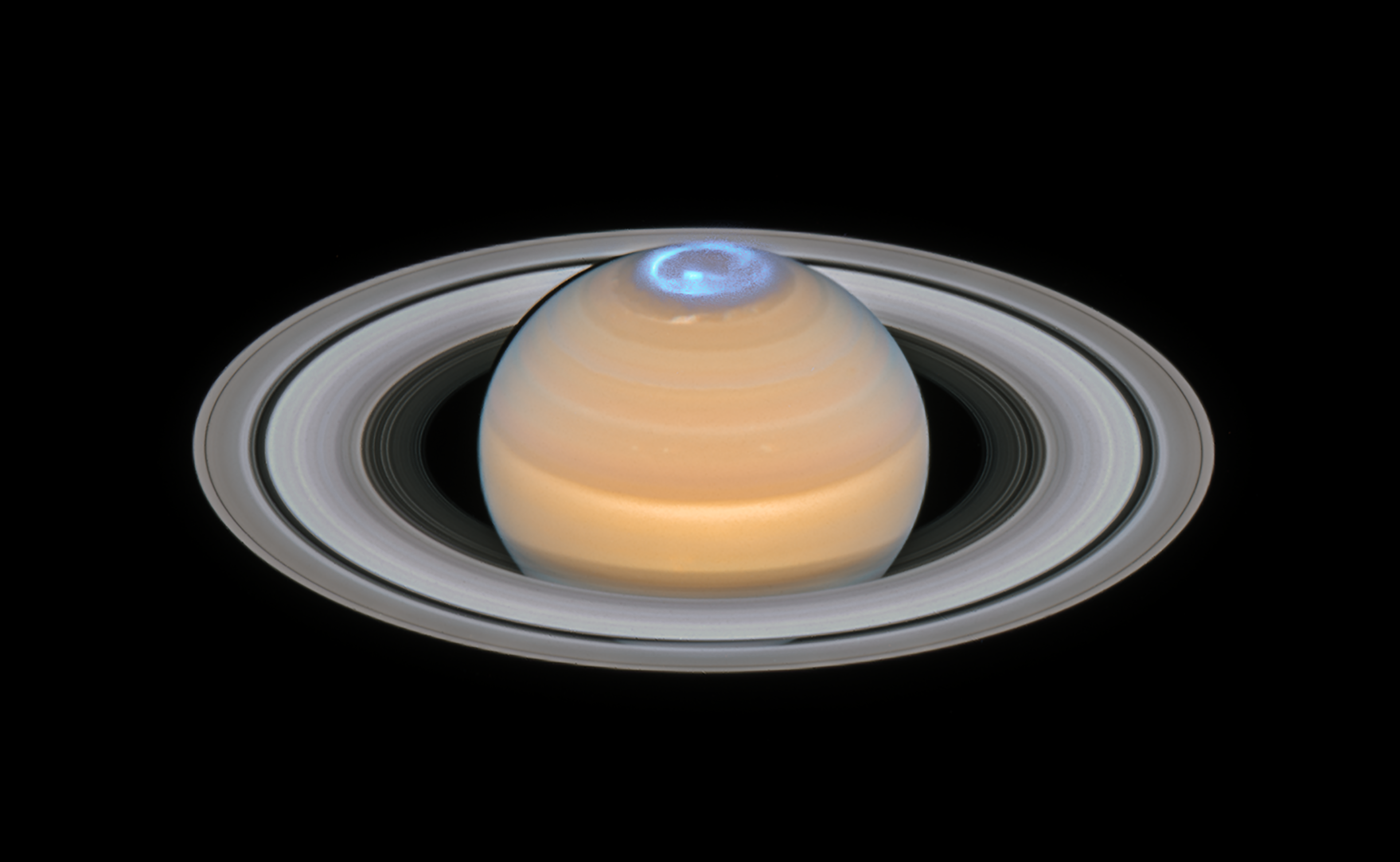
Saturn and its northern auroras (composite image).

Unlike Jupiter's, Saturn's main auroral ovals are not related to the breakdown of the co–rotation of the plasma in the outer parts of the planet's magnetosphere. The aurorae on Saturn are thought to be connected to the reconnection of the magnetic field under the influence of the Solar wind (Dungey cycle), which drives an upward current (about 10 million amperes) from the ionosphere and leads to the acceleration and precipitation of energetic (1–10 keV) electrons into the polar thermosphere of Saturn. The Saturnian aurorae are more similar to those of the Earth, where they are also Solar wind driven. The ovals themselves correspond to the boundaries between open and closed magnetic field lines—so called polar caps, which are thought to reside at the distance of 10–15° from the poles.

The aurorae of Saturn are highly variable. Their location and brightness strongly depends on the Solar wind pressure: the aurorae become brighter and move closer to the poles when the Solar wind pressure increases. The bright auroral features are observed to rotate with the angular speed of 60–75% that of Saturn. From time to time bright features appear in the dawn sector of the main oval or inside it. The average total power emitted by the aurorae is about 50 GW in the far ultraviolet (80–170 nm) and 150–300 GW in the near-infrared (3–4 μm—H_{3}^{+} emissions) parts of the spectrum.

Timelapse of Saturn's northern Aurora

=== Saturn kilometric radiation ===
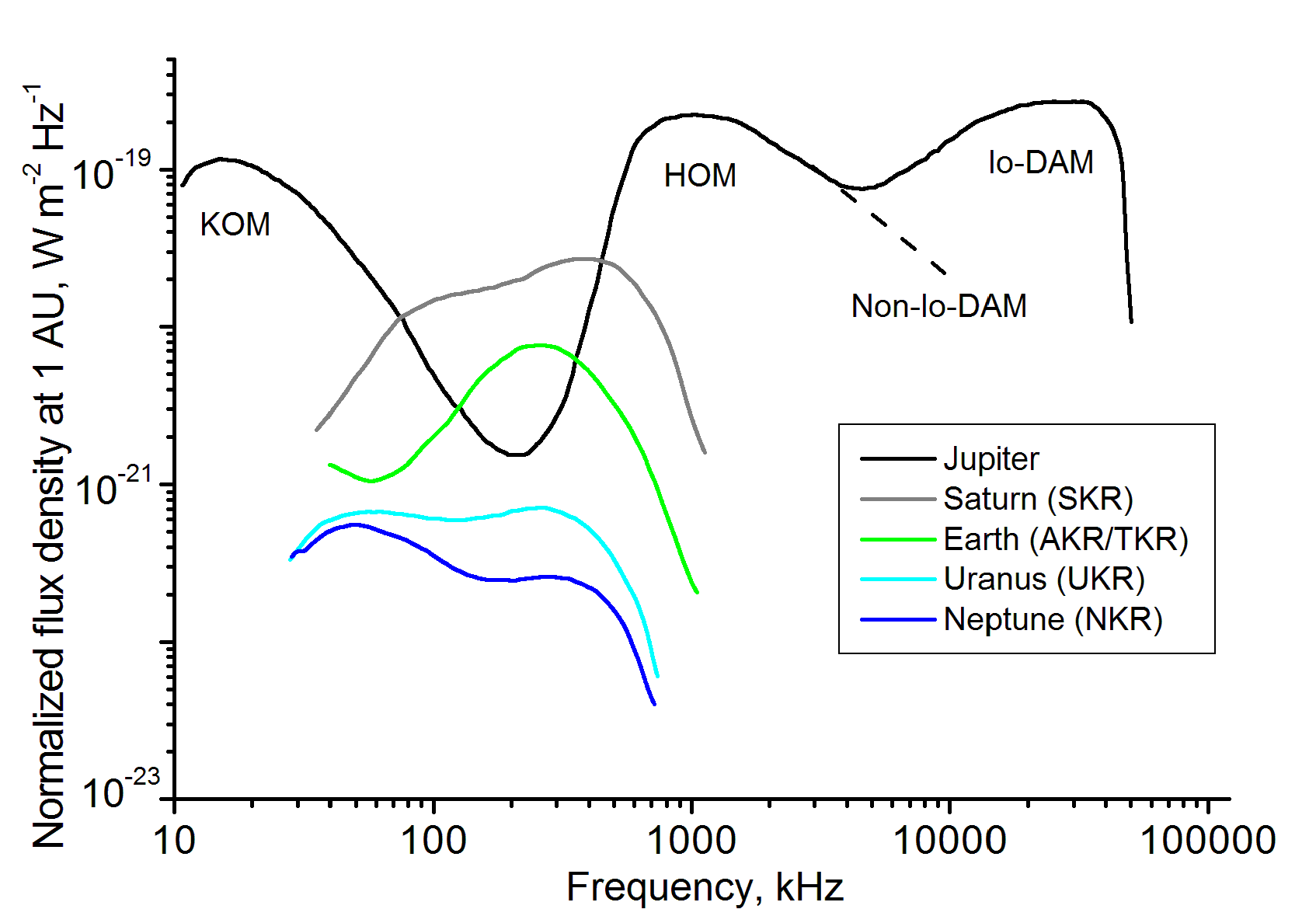
The spectrum of Saturn's radio emissions compared with spectra of four other magnetized planets

Saturn is the source of rather strong low frequency radio emissions called Saturn kilometric radiation (SKR). The frequency of SKR lies in the range 10–1300 kHz (wavelength of a few kilometers) with the maximum around 400 kHz. The power of these emissions is strongly modulated by the rotation of the planet and is correlated with changes in the solar wind pressure. For instance, when Saturn was immersed into the giant magnetotail of Jupiter during Voyager 2 flyby in 1981, the SKR power decreased greatly or even ceased completely. The kilometric radiation is thought to be generated by the Cyclotron Maser Instability of the electrons moving along magnetic field lines related to the auroral regions of Saturn. Thus the SKR is related to the auroras around the poles of the planet. The radiation itself comprises spectrally diffuse emissions as well as narrowband tones with bandwidths as narrow as 200 Hz. In the frequency–time plane, arc-like features are often observed, much like in the case of the Jovian kilometric radiation. The total power of the SKR is around 1 GW.

The modulation of the radio emissions by planetary rotation is traditionally used to determine the rotation period of the interiors of fluid giant planets. In the case of Saturn, however, this appears to be impossible, as the period varies at the timescale of ten years. In 1980–1981 the periodicity in the radio emissions as measured by Voyager 1 and 2 was 10 h 39 min 24 ± 7 s, which was then adopted as the rotational period of Saturn. Scientists were surprised when Galileo and then Cassini returned a different value—10 h 45 min 45 ± 36 s. Further observation indicated that the modulation period changes by as much as 1% on the characteristic timescale of 20–30 days with an additional long-term trend. There is a correlation between the period and solar wind speed, however, the causes of this change remain a mystery. One reason may be that the Saturnian perfectly axially symmetric magnetic field fails to impose a strict corotation on the magnetospheric plasma making it slip relative to the planet. The lack of a precise correlation between the variation period of SKR and planetary rotation makes it all but impossible to determine the true rotational period of Saturn.

=== Radiation belts ===
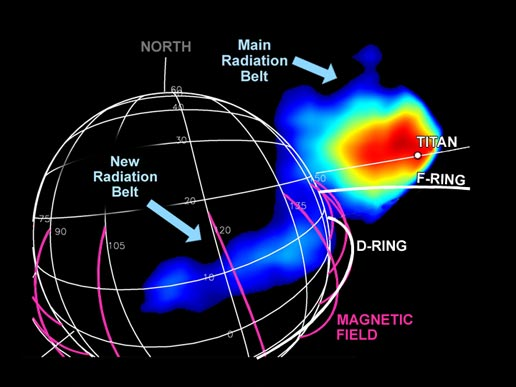
Saturn's radiation belts

Saturn has relatively weak radiation belts, because energetic particles are absorbed by the moons and particulate material orbiting the planet. The densest (main) radiation belt lies between the inner edge of the Enceladus gas torus at 3.5 R_{s} and the outer edge of the A Ring at 2.3 R_{s}. It contains protons and relativistic electrons with energies from hundreds of kiloelectronvolts (keV) to as high as tens of megaelectronvolts (MeV) and possibly other ions. Beyond 3.5 R_{s} the energetic particles are absorbed by the neutral gas and their numbers drop, although less energetic particles with energies in the range of hundreds keV appear again beyond 6 R_{s}—these are the same particles that contribute to the ring current. The electrons in the main belt probably originate in the outer magnetosphere or Solar wind, from which they are transported by the diffusion and then adiabatically heated. However, the energetic protons consist of two populations of particles. The first population with energies of less than about 10 MeV has the same origin as electrons, while the second one with the maximum flux near 20 MeV results from the interaction of cosmic rays with solid material present in the Saturnian system (so called cosmic ray albedo neutron decay process—CRAND). The main radiation belt of Saturn is strongly influenced by interplanetary solar wind disturbances.

The innermost region of the magnetosphere near the rings is generally devoid of energetic ions and electrons because they are absorbed by ring particles. Saturn, however, has the second radiation belt discovered by Cassini in 2004 and located just inside the innermost D Ring. This belt probably consists of energetic charged particles formed via the CRAND process or of ionized energetic neutral atoms coming from the main radiation belt.

The saturnian radiation belts are generally much weaker than those of Jupiter and do not emit much microwave radiation (with frequency of a few Gigahertz). Estimates shows that their decimetric radio emissions (DIM) would be impossible to detect from the Earth. Nevertherless the high energy particles cause weathering of the surfaces of the icy moons and sputter water, water products and oxygen from them.

== Interaction with rings and moons ==
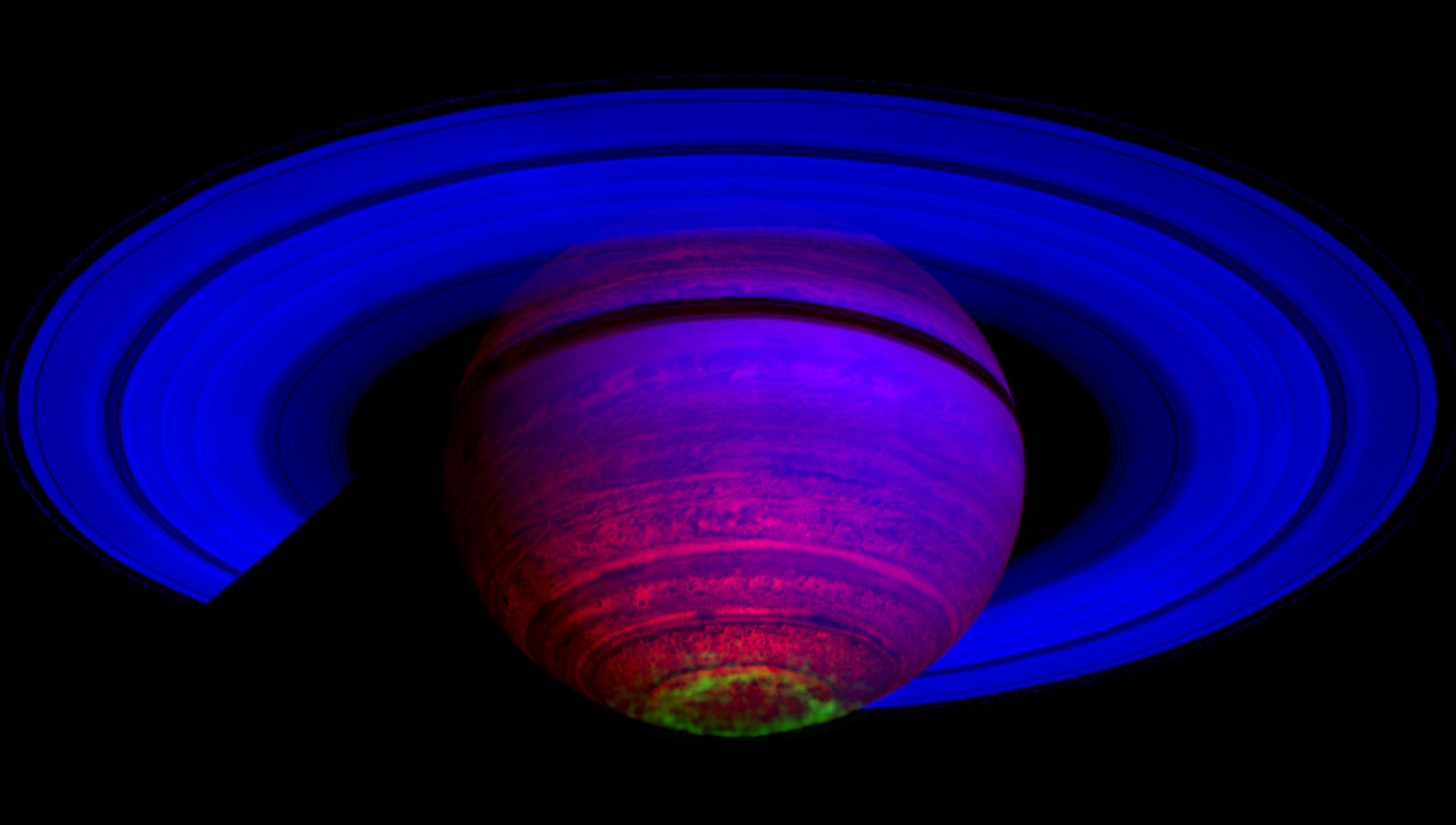
False-colour composite image showing the glow of auroras streaking out about 1,000 kilometres from the cloud tops of Saturn's south polar region

The abundant population of solid bodies orbiting Saturn including moons as well as ring particles exerts a strong influence on the magnetosphere of Saturn. The plasma in the magnetosphere co-rotates with the planet, continuously impinging on the trailing hemispheres of slowly moving moons. While ring particles and the majority of moons only passively absorb plasma and energetic charged particles, three moons – Enceladus, Dione and Titan – are significant sources of new plasma. The absorption of energetic electrons and ions reveals itself by noticeable gaps in the radiation belts of Saturn near the moon's orbits, while the dense rings of Saturn eliminate all energetic electrons and ions closer than 2.2 R_{S}, creating a low radiation zone in the vicinity of the planet. The absorption of the co-rotating plasma by a moon disturbs the magnetic field in its empty wake—the field is pulled towards a moon, creating a region of a stronger magnetic field in the near wake.

The three moons mentioned above add new plasma into the magnetosphere. By far the strongest source is Enceladus, which ejects a fountain of water vapor, carbon dioxide and nitrogen through cracks in its south pole region. A fraction of this gas is ionized by the hot electrons and solar ultraviolet radiation and is added to the co-rotational plasma flow. Titan once was thought to be the principal source of plasma in Saturn's magnetosphere, especially of nitrogen. The new data obtained by Cassini in 2004–2008 established that it is not a significant source of nitrogen after all, although it may still provide significant amounts of hydrogen (due to dissociation of methane). Dione is the third moon producing more new plasma than it absorbs. The mass of plasma created in the vicinity of it (about 6 g/s) is about 1/300 as much as near Enceladus. However, even this low value can not be explained only by sputtering of its icy surface by energetic particles, which may indicate that Dione is endogenously active like Enceladus. The moons that create new plasma slow the motion of the co-rotating plasma in their vicinity, which leads to the pile-up of the magnetic field lines in front of them and weakening of the field in their wakes—the field drapes around them. This is the opposite to what is observed for the plasma-absorbing moons.

The plasma and energetic particles present in the magnetosphere of Saturn, when absorbed by ring particles and moons, cause radiolysis of the water ice. Its products include ozone, hydrogen peroxide and molecular oxygen. The first one has been detected in the surfaces of Rhea and Dione, while the second is thought to be responsible for the steep spectral slopes of moons' reflectivities in the ultraviolet region. The oxygen produced by radiolysis forms tenuous atmospheres around rings and icy moons. The ring atmosphere was detected by Cassini for the first time in 2004. A fraction of the oxygen gets ionized, creating a small population of O_{2}^{+} ions in the magnetosphere. The influence of Saturn's magnetosphere on its moons is more subtle than the influence of Jupiter on its moons. In the latter case, the magnetosphere contains a significant number of sulfur ions, which, when implanted in surfaces, produce characteristic spectral signatures. In the case of Saturn, the radiation levels are much lower and the plasma is composed mainly of water products, which, when implanted, are indistinguishable from the ice already present.

== Exploration ==
As of 2014 the magnetosphere of Saturn has been directly explored by four spacecraft. The first mission to study the magnetosphere was Pioneer 11 in September 1979. Pioneer 11 discovered the magnetic field and made some measurements of the plasma parameters. In November 1980 and August 1981, Voyager 1–2 probes investigated the magnetosphere using an improved set of instruments. From the fly-by trajectories they measured the planetary magnetic field, plasma composition and density, high energy particle energy and spatial distribution, plasma waves and radio emissions. Cassini spacecraft was launched in 1997, and arrived in 2004, making the first measurements in more than two decades. The spacecraft continued to provide information about the magnetic field and plasma parameters of the saturnian magnetosphere until its intentional destruction on September 15, 2017.

In the 1990s, the Ulysses spacecraft conducted extensive measurements of the Saturnian kilometric radiation (SKR), which is unobservable from Earth due to the absorption in the ionosphere. The SKR is powerful enough to be detected from a spacecraft at the distance of several astronomical units from the planet. Ulysses discovered that the period of the SKR varies by as much as 1%, and therefore is not directly related to the rotation period of the interior of Saturn.

== Bibliography ==
- Andre, N.; Blanc, M.; Maurice, S.; et al. (2008). "Identification of Saturn's magnetospheric regions and associated plasma processes: Synopsis of Cassini observations during orbit insertion". Reviews of Geophysics. 46 (4): RG4008. Bibcode:2008RvGeo..46.4008A. doi:10.1029/2007RG000238. hdl:2027.42/94634. S2CID 43009497.
- Belenkaya, E.S.; Alexeev, I.I.; Kalagaev, V.V.; Blohhina, M.S. (2006). "Definition of Saturn's magnetospheric model parameters for the Pioneer 11 flyby" (PDF). Annales Geophysicae. 24 (3): 1145–56. Bibcode:2006AnGeo..24.1145B. doi:10.5194/angeo-24-1145-2006.
- Bhardwaj, Anil; Gladstone, G. Randall (2000). "Auroral emissions of the giant planets". Reviews of Geophysics. 38 (3): 295–353. Bibcode:2000RvGeo..38..295B. doi:10.1029/1998RG000046.
- Blanc, M.; Kallenbach, R.; Erkaev, N.V. (2005). "Solar System Magnetospheres". Space Science Reviews. 116 (1–2): 227–298. Bibcode:2005SSRv..116..227B. doi:10.1007/s11214-005-1958-y. S2CID 122318569.
- Brown, Larry W. (1975). "Saturn radio emission near 1 MHz". Journal of Geophysical Research. 112: L89–L92. Bibcode:1975ApJ...198L..89B. doi:10.1086/181819. hdl:2060/19750007447. S2CID 123085550.
- Bunce, E.J.; Cowley, S.W.H.; Alexeev, I.I.; et al. (2007). "Cassini observations of the variation of Saturn's ring current parameters with system size". Journal of Geophysical Research: Space Physics. 198 (A10): A10202. Bibcode:2007JGRA..11210202B. doi:10.1029/2007JA012275.
- Clark, J.T.; Gerard, J.-C.; Grodent D.; et al. (2005). "Morphological differences between Saturn's ultraviolet aurorae and those of Earth and Jupiter" (PDF). Nature. 433 (7027): 717–719. Bibcode:2005Natur.433..717C. doi:10.1038/nature03331. hdl:2268/4538. PMID 15716945. S2CID 4379846. Archived from the original (PDF) on 2011-07-16.
- Cowley, S.W.H.; Arridge, C.S.; Bunce, E.J.; et al. (2008). "Auroral current systems in Saturn's magnetosphere: comparison of theoretical models with Cassini and HST observations". Annales Geophysicae. 26 (9): 2613–2630. Bibcode:2008AnGeo..26.2613C. doi:10.5194/angeo-26-2613-2008.
- Gombosi, Tamas I.; Armstrong, Thomas P.; Arridge, Christopher S.; et al. (2009). "Saturn's Magnetospheric Configuration". Saturn from Cassini–Huygens. Springer Netherlands. pp. 203–255. doi:10.1007/978-1-4020-9217-6_9. ISBN 978-1-4020-9217-6.
- Gurnett, D.A.; Kurth, W.S.; Hospodarsky, G.B.; et al. (2005). "Radio and Plasma Wave Observations at Saturn from Cassini's Approach and First Orbit". Science. 307 (5713): 1255–59. Bibcode:2005Sci...307.1255G. doi:10.1126/science.1105356. PMID 15604362. S2CID 19400012.
- Johnson, R.E.; Luhmann, J.G.; Tokar, R.L.; et al. (2008). "Production, ionization and redistribution of O2 in Saturn's ring atmosphere" (PDF). Icarus. 180 (2): 393–402. Bibcode:2006Icar..180..393J. doi:10.1016/j.icarus.2005.08.021.
- Kivelson, Margaret Galland (2005). "The current systems of the Jovian magnetosphere and ionosphere and predictions for Saturn" (PDF). Space Science Reviews. 116 (1–2): 299–318. Bibcode:2005SSRv..116..299K. doi:10.1007/s11214-005-1959-x. S2CID 17740545. Archived from the original (PDF) on 2011-09-29.
- Kivelson, M.G. (2005). "Transport and acceleration of plasma in the magnetospheres of Earth and Jupiter and expectations for Saturn" (PDF). Advances in Space Research. 36 (11): 2077–89. Bibcode:2005AdSpR..36.2077K. CiteSeerX 10.1.1.486.8721. doi:10.1016/j.asr.2005.05.104. Archived from the original (PDF) on 2011-09-29.
- Kurth, W.S.; Bunce, E.J.; Clarke, J.T.; et al. (2009). "Auroral Processes". Saturn from Cassini–Huygens. Springer Netherlands. pp. 333–374. doi:10.1007/978-1-4020-9217-6_12. ISBN 978-1-4020-9217-6.
- Leisner, S.; Khurana, K.K.; Russell, C.T.; et al. (2007). "Observations of Enceladus and Dione as Sources for Saturn's Neutral Cloud". Lunar and Planetary Science. XXXVIII (1338): 1425. Bibcode:2007LPI....38.1425L.
- Mauk, B.H.; Hamilton, D.C.; Hill, T.W.; et al. (2009). "Fundamental Plasma Processes in Saturn's Magnetosphere". Saturn from Cassini–Huygens. Springer Netherlands. pp. 281–331. doi:10.1007/978-1-4020-9217-6_11. ISBN 978-1-4020-9217-6.
- Nichols, J.D.; Badman, S.V.; Bunce, E.J.; et al. (2009). "Saturn's equinoctial auroras" (PDF). Geophysical Research Letters. 36 (24): L24102:1–5. Bibcode:2009GeoRL..3624102N. doi:10.1029/2009GL041491. hdl:2027.42/95061.
- Paranicas, C.; Mitchell, D.G.; Krimigis, S.M.; et al. (2007). "Sources and losses of energetic protons in Saturn's magnetosphere" (PDF). Icarus. 197 (2): 519–525. Bibcode:2008Icar..197..519P. doi:10.1016/j.icarus.2008.05.011.
- Russell, C.T. (1993). "Planetary Magnetospheres". Reports on Progress in Physics. 56 (6): 687–732. Bibcode:1993RPPh...56..687R. doi:10.1088/0034-4885/56/6/001. S2CID 250897924.
- Russell, C.T.; Jackman, C.M.; Wei, H.Y.; et al. (2008). "Titan's influence on Saturnian substorm occurrence". Geophysical Research Letters. 35 (12): L12105. Bibcode:2008GeoRL..3512105R. doi:10.1029/2008GL034080. hdl:11336/20684.
- Sittler, E.C.; Andre, N.; Blanc, M.; et al. (2008). "Ion and neutral sources and sinks within Saturn's inner magnetosphere: Cassini results" (PDF). Planetary and Space Science. 56 (1): 3–18. Bibcode:2008P&SS...56....3S. doi:10.1016/j.pss.2007.06.006. Archived from the original (PDF) on 2012-03-02.
- Smith, H.T.; Shappirio, M.; Johnson, R.E.; et al. (2008). "Enceladus: A potential source of ammonia products and molecular nitrogen for Saturn's magnetosphere" (PDF). Journal of Geophysical Research. 113 (A11): A11206. Bibcode:2008JGRA..11311206S. doi:10.1029/2008JA013352.
- Smith, A.L.; Carr, T.D (1959). "Radio frequency observations of the planets in 1957–1958". The Astrophysical Journal. 130: 641–647. Bibcode:1959ApJ...130..641S. doi:10.1086/146753.
- Sontag, A; Clark, G; Kollmann, P (2021). "Charge exchange ion losses in Saturn's magnetosphere". Journal of Geophysical Research: Space Physics. 126 (10) e2021JA029310. Bibcode:2021JGRA..12629310S. doi:10.1029/2021JA029310. S2CID 239407798.
- Tokar, R.L.; Johnson, R.E.; Hill, T.V.; et al. (2006). "The Interaction of the Atmosphere of Enceladus with Saturn's Plasma". Science. 311 (5766): 1409–12. Bibcode:2006Sci...311.1409T. doi:10.1126/science.1121061. PMID 16527967. S2CID 35626177.
- Young, D.T.; Berthelier, J.-J.; Blanc, M.; et al. (2005). "Composition and Dynamics of Plasma in Saturn's Magnetosphere". Science. 307 (5713): 1262–66. Bibcode:2005Sci...307.1262Y. doi:10.1126/science.1106151. PMID 15731443. S2CID 33409338.
- Zarka, P.; Kurth, W.S. (2005). "Radio wave emissions from the outer planets before Cassini". Space Science Reviews. 116 (1–2): 371–397. Bibcode:2005SSRv..116..371Z. doi:10.1007/s11214-005-1962-2. S2CID 85508751.
- Zarka, Phillipe; Lamy, Laurent; Cecconi, Baptiste; Prangé, Renée; Rucker, Helmut O. (2007). "Modulation of Saturn's radio clock by solar wind speed" (PDF). Nature. 450 (7167): 265–267. Bibcode:2007Natur.450..265Z. doi:10.1038/nature06237. PMID 17994092. S2CID 429702. Archived from the original (PDF) on 2011-06-03.
