= Chapman Medal =

Award of the Royal Astronomical Society

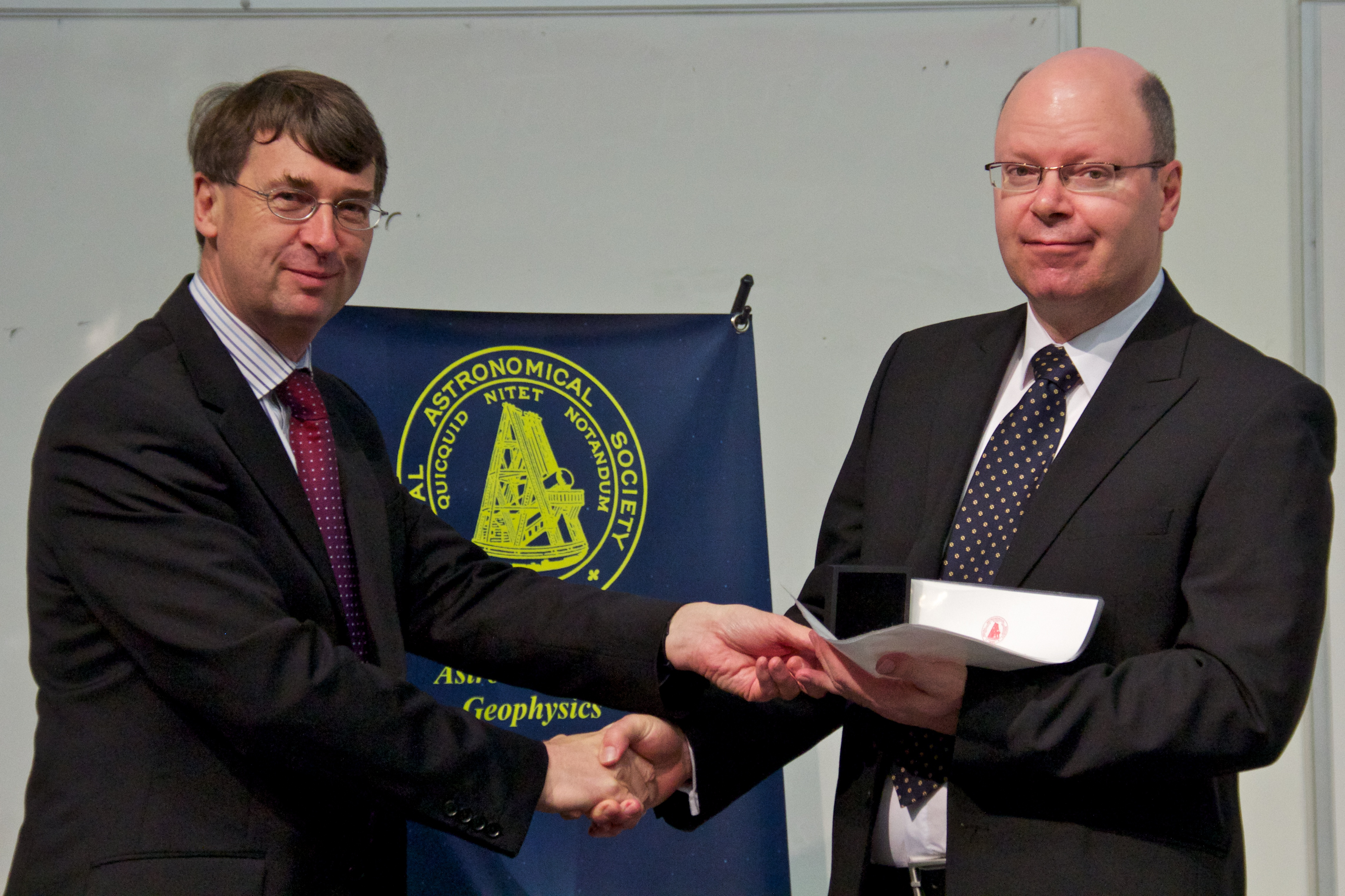
- Presented by: Royal Astronomical Society
- First award: 1973
- Website: https://ras.ac.uk/awards-grants/awards/chapman-medal

The Chapman Medal is an award of the Royal Astronomical Society, given for "investigations of outstanding merit in the science of the Sun, space and planetary environments or solar-terrestrial physics". It is named after Sydney Chapman (1888–1970), a British geophysicist who worked on solar-terrestrial physics and aeronomy. The medal was first awarded in 1973, initially on a triennial basis. From 2004 to 2012 it was awarded biennially, and since 2012 has been annual.

== Medallists ==
Source: Royal Astronomical Society

Year	Winner	Source
2026	Mathew Owens	
2025	Nigel Meredith	
2024	Valery Nakariakov	
2023	Nicholas Achilleos	
2022	Sandra Chapman	
2021	Ineke De Moortel	
2020	Cathryn Mitchell	
2019	Tom Stallard	
2018	Emma Bunce	
2017	Mervyn Freeman	
2016	Philippa Browning	
2015	Alan Hood	
2014	Louise Harra	
2013	Stephen Milan	
2012	Andrew Fazakerley	
2010	Bernard Roberts	
2008	André Balogh	
2006	Steven Jay Schwartz	
2004	Richard Harrison	
2001	Jeremy Bloxham	
1998	Mike Lockwood	
1994	Ian Axford	
1991	Stan Cowley	
1988	D. Ian Gough	
1985	Peter Goldreich	
1982	Jim Dungey	
1979	Eugene Parker	
1976	Syun-Ichi Akasofu	
1973	Drummond Matthews and Frederick Vine	

== See also ==
- List of geophysics awards
