= Nicola Fox =

Heliophysicist

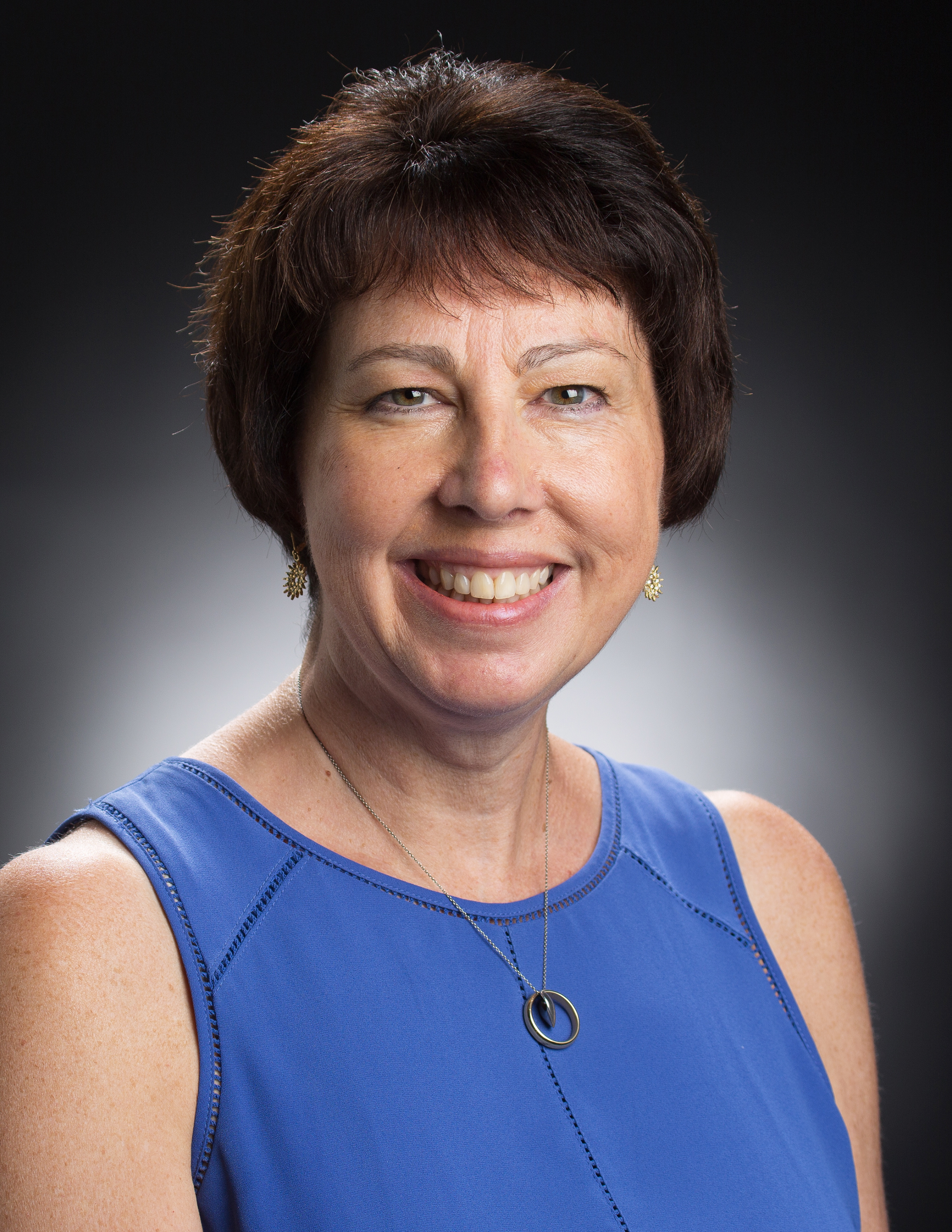
- Fox in 2017
- Born: Nicola Justine Fox; 1968 (age 57–58); Hitchin, Hertfordshire, England
- Education: St Francis' College, Letchworth; Imperial College London (BSc, PhD); University of Surrey (MS)
- Known for: Heliophysics
- Awards: NASA Group Achievement Award ('98, '00)
- Scientific career
- Workplaces: NASA; Johns Hopkins University
- Thesis: Ionospheric convection during substorms (1995)
- Doctoral advisor: Stan Cowley
- Website: www.nasa.gov/people/nicola-fox

Nicola Justine Fox (born 1968) is the associate administrator for NASA's Science Mission Directorate. Appointed to the position in February 2023, she is therefore NASA's head of science.

She previously served as the director of NASA's Heliophysics Science Division and in the Johns Hopkins Applied Physics Laboratory. Fox was the lead scientist for the Parker Solar Probe, and served as the Science and Operations Coordinator for the International Solar-Terrestrial Physics Science Initiative.

== Early life and education ==
Fox was born in Hitchin, Hertfordshire, England. When she was eight months old her father showed her the Apollo 11 Moon landing on television. He continued to encourage her love of science, explaining to her the movement of the planets and identifying stars in the night's sky. She attended St. Francis' College in Letchworth Garden City in Hertfordshire, a private all-girls school. When she arrived at university she was often the only girl in her science classes.

Fox completed a bachelor's degree in physics at Imperial College London in 1990. She earned a master's degree in telecommunications and satellite engineering at the University of Surrey in 1991. She returned to Imperial College London for her doctoral studies, and served as the Imperial College Union's Women's Officer. She completed a PhD in space and atmospheric physics at Imperial College London in 1995. Her dissertation investigated geomagnetic storms and was supervised by Stan Cowley.

Fox received an honorary doctorate from the University of Hertfordshire on 12 September 2024.

== Research and career ==
After her PhD, Fox moved to the Goddard Space Flight Center as a US National Research Council postdoctoral fellow, where she was mentored by Mario Acuña. At Goddard, Fox worked on Sun-Earth connections. Fox led outreach programs on space weather, and has continued public engagement throughout her scientific career. Fox joined Johns Hopkins University Applied Physics Laboratory in 1998, where she remained as Science and Operations coordinator for the International Solar-Terrestrial Physics Science Initiative. Her research focuses on solar system plasma physics and data analysis. She studies the magnetopause using a range of spacecraft. She has since worked on the NASA Polar spacecraft.

In 2008 Fox was the deputy project scientist for Living With a Star, NASA's Van Allen Probes mission. Fox joined the heliophysics space research branch in 2015. She was lead Project Scientist for the Parker Solar Probe mission, and was present at the launch in August 2018. The probe looks to understand the coronal heating problem and the origins of the solar wind. In 2017 Fox delivered a TED talk on Touching the Sun.

Fox moved to the NASA Headquarters in September 2018, when she was appointed as the head of the Heliophysics Science Division. Work in the Heliophysics Science Division considers space phenomena relating to the sun, and includes robotic missions and satellites. The deputy director is Margaret Luce. Fox was appointed the Associate Administrator for NASA's Science Mission Directorate on February 27, 2023, making her the organization's Head of Science.

Fox has served as associate editor for Geophysical Research Letters and the Journal of Atmospheric and Solar-Terrestrial Physics. She is an expert for The Planetary Society.

=== Awards and honours ===
- 1993 European Geosciences Union Young Scientists Award
- 1997 International Solar-Terrestrial Physics Science Initiative Outstanding Performance Award
- 1998 NASA Group Achievement Award
- 2000 NASA Group Achievement Award
- 2023 Interviewed by Lauren Laverne on Desert Island Discs
- 2026 Women in Aerospace Lifetime Achievement Award :>

== Personal life ==
Fox married John Sigwarth but he died suddenly in 2010 when their children were very young. They had two children, James and Darcy, two and a half years apart.
