= James Dungey =

British space scientist

Jim Dungey
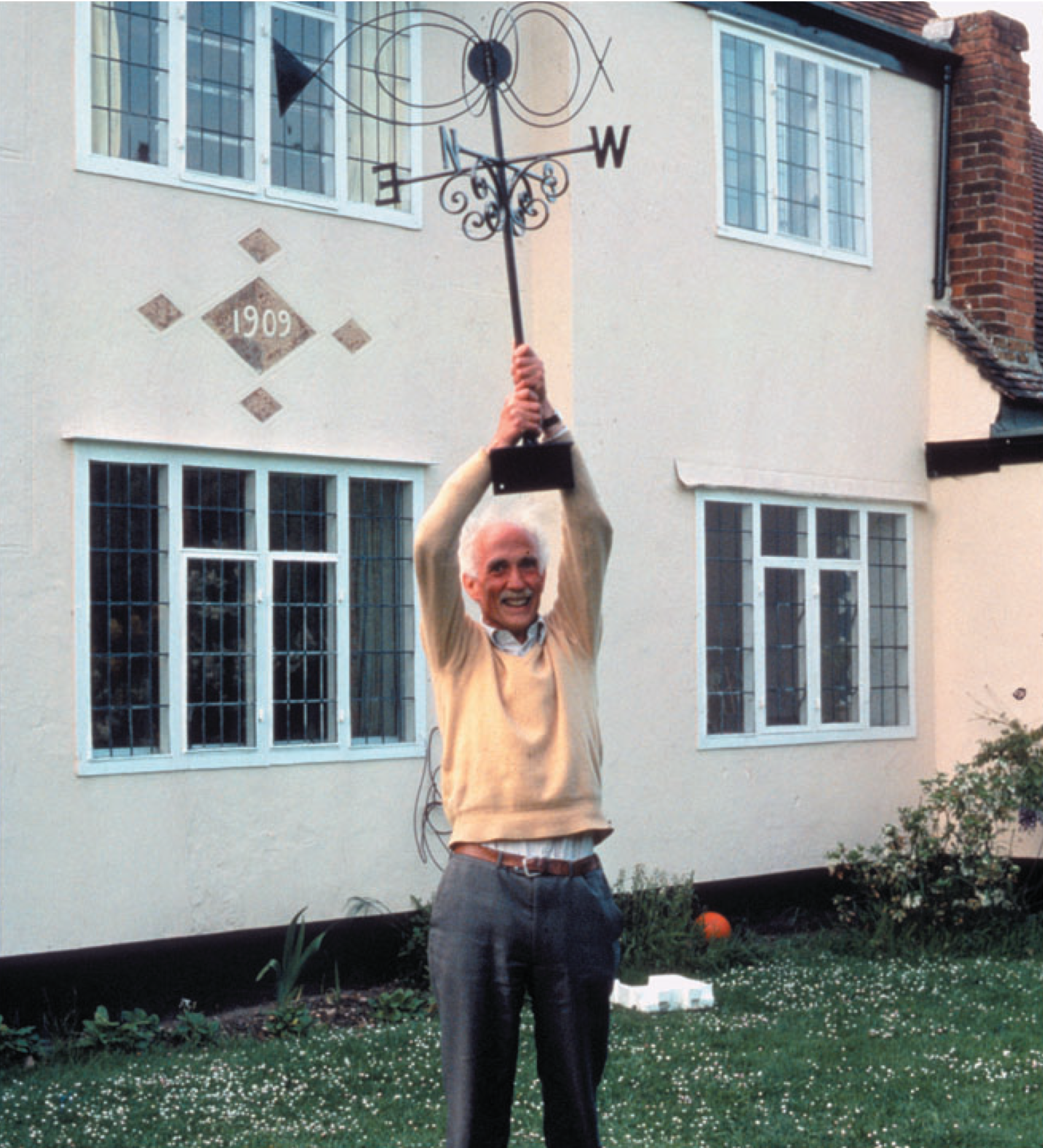
- Dungey outside his home in Walberswick, holding aloft a weather vane given to him by colleagues at Imperial College London on his retirement in 1985. The vane is in the form of the schematic in his 1961 paper which introduced the concepts of magnetic reconnection and the open magnetosphere
- Born: James Wynne Dungey; 1923
- Died: 2015 (aged 91–92)
- Education: University of Cambridge
- Scientific career
- Workplaces: University of Sydney; Imperial College London; Pennsylvania State University
- Thesis: Some researches in cosmic magnetism (1951)
- Doctoral advisor: Fred Hoyle
- Doctoral students: Stan Cowley

James Wynne Dungey (1923–2015) was a British space scientist who was pivotal in establishing the field of space weather and made significant contributions to the fundamental understanding of plasma physics.

== Early life and education ==
Dungey grew up in Stamford, Lincolnshire, the son of a schoolteacher. During World War II, he worked at British Thompson-Houston in Rugby, on developments for radar. After the end of the war, he gained a degree in 1947 from Magdalene College, Cambridge, part of the University of Cambridge. He then completed a Ph.D. at the same institution, under the supervision of Fred Hoyle.

== Career and research ==
From 1950 to 1953 Dungey worked at the University of Sydney with Ron Giovanelli, from 1953 to 1954 at Pennsylvania State University, and from 1954 to 1957 back at the University of Cambridge. From 1957 to 1959 he was a mathematics lecturer at King's College, Newcastle upon Tyne (now Newcastle University) and from 1959 to 1963 he worked at the UK Atomic Weapons Establishment. In 1963 he moved to the Blackett Laboratory of Imperial College London, where he was a physics professor from 1965 to until his retirement in 1984.

=== The discovery of magnetic reconnection ===
Dungey introduced the concept of magnetic reconnection, a mechanism that was not initially accepted but is now recognized to be of fundamental importance in all areas of plasma (ionized gas) physics. Magnetic reconnection has key effects on astrophysical, space, and laboratory plasmas in converting magnetic energy into heat and energised charged particles. It also enables a wide range of phenomena by reconfiguring magnetic field lines. Reconnection is a process that occurs in the solar corona, interplanetary space, Earth's magnetosphere, fusion tokamaks and many astrophysical objects. It is also the key controlling factor in space weather effects on operational systems, causing the release of energy in solar flares and coronal mass ejections (CMEs) and being the key mechanism that transfers energy from the solar wind flow (and its enhancement due to CMEs) to Earth's space environment, the magnetosphere. It is also very important in fusion research, causing problems for the magnetic confinement of the plasma in tokamaks but is harnessed in some devices to help compress the plasma.

Dungey considered the origins of the known system of currents in the polar ionospheres detected using high-latitude magnetometers. He had been steered toward this work by his PhD supervisor, Fred Hoyle, after Hoyle examined the DSc thesis of Ron Giovanelli in Sydney, Australia—a thesis that contained the concept of magnetic nulls acting to power solar flares by annihilating oppositely-directed magnetic fields at current sheets. Hoyle wondered if some such mechanism could power Earth's aurora. Dungey's innovations were to restrict the region of magnetic interaction in the current sheet and predict the magnetic field topology changes: this allowed energised particles and reconnected magnetic flux to escape along the current sheet

=== Initial reaction and acceptance of reconnection ===
Dungey initially had difficulty in getting his work published. The most important journal for British space physics research at the time was Monthly Notices of the Royal Astronomical Society but his submission there was rejected. On the advice of Sydney Chapman he submitted the work to Philosophical Magazine, where it was finally accepted. There were technical problems with the mechanism that needed to be overcome. For example the initial theory of Parker and Sweet, although giving magnetic reconnection, is not fast enough and could not deliver enough voltage (which, by Faraday's law, equals flux magnetic transfer rate). This was solved by aerodynamicist Harry Petschek who added shock fronts standing on the inflow to the reconnection site: these have a number of effects but crucially open up the outflow region to allow more rapid ejection of reconnected flux and plasma along the current sheet, that being the limitation to Parker-Sweet reconnection and the cause of the choking-off of magnetic annihilation. Now it is recognised that the same role is played by Alfvén waves.

In addition to this valid problem which needed to be overcome, a great many spurious problems were raised: for example, the inappropriate application of "Lenz's law" (a problem Dungey was aware of and had solved in his PhD work) and unnecessary philosophical objections to the concept of moving magnetic field lines. Dungey's 1961 paper described what came to be called the "open magnetosphere model" and only shortly preceded the advent of in-situ measurements by spacecraft. As more space data were accrued, the longer the list grew of features of magnetospheric and ionospheric structure and behaviour that were uniquely explained by his idea. Nevertheless, ironically, acceptance of the concept was more universal in areas away from magnetospheric physics, such as solar physics, astrophysics and laboratory plasma physics (including fusion research). In particular, Nobel laureate Hannes Alfvén was a vocal, trenchant and influential critic, rejecting reconnection along with his own (and now almost universally-used) concept of frozen-in magnetic flux for large-scale plasmas (also called "Alfvén's theorem" or "ideal MHD"), which was part of the formulation of magnetohydrodynamics (MHD) for which he gained the Nobel prize in 1970. Reconnection is a breakdown of ideal MHD that occurs in thin current sheets and provides the solution to one of the biggest objections to ideal MHD by untangling field lines that would otherwise be ever more tangled by plasma velocity shears and vortices if frozen-in applied without it. Today, reconnection is well established as a key mechanism which is vital in explaining the transfer of mass, energy and momentum from the solar wind to the magnetosphere, thereby driving terrestrial space weather and geomagnetic disturbance.

The circulation of plasma in the magnetosphere caused by reconnection is called "convection" and often referred to as the Dungey Cycle. Dungey envisaged this as a steady circulation with electric fields mapping throughout the magnetosphere (as predicted by Faraday's law for steady state); however, imbalances in the reconnection voltages in the dayside magnetopause and in the nightside tail current sheet were later recognised as the source of the phenomenon of the auroral substorm cycle. The convection circulation in the ionosphere and magnetosphere for these non-steady conditions is explained by the "expanding contracting polar cap" (ECPC) model and the Dungey Cycle is understood in terms of the plasma (and frozen-in field) motions returning the magnetosphere-ionosphere system towards equilibrium after it has been perturbed by the dayside and/or tail reconnection.

=== Later life ===
The citation for the award of Honorary Membership of the European Geophysical Society (now the European Geosciences Union) in 1994 emphasised the importance and breadth of Dungey's work both as a scientist and in training later generations.

A great many features of Earth's magnetosphere were first proposed and investigated by Dungey after he had proposed magnetic reconnection. He was the first to compute the length of the geomagnetic tail and his value was in good agreement with that found by the first spacecraft missions to visit that region of space. He predicted "lobe reconnection" when the interplanetary magnetic field points northward, which is observed by low-Earth orbit spacecraft (for example during the Space hurricane event) and in observations of dayside auroral forms. Lobe reconnection has the important implication that the magnetosphere is rarely, if ever, an equilibrium system. Dungey was the first to suggest that MHD waves in the outer magnetosphere were the sources of oscillations seen at the Earth's surface and that these continuous pulsations were a resonant process and, in particular he recognised the role of Kelvin-Helmholtz waves on magnetospheric boundaries in this context and (with David Southwood) showed these phenomena gave important mechanisms and diagnostics. He was the first to recognise the importance of magnetosphere-ionosphere coupling and worked with his student Stephen Knight on the generation of field-aligned potential drops. He proposed particle diffusion in the radiation belts, and (with Stan Cowley and Ted Speiser) waves and particles in current sheets. Dungey was also the first to recognise that gyro-resonant interactions between whistler-mode waves and Van Allen radiation belt electrons are significant for precipitating the latter into the ionosphere, a mechanism that is fundamental to modern studies of the radiation belts.

Dungey also supervised a series of space physicists who went on to make contributions to the field, such as David Southwood, Stan Cowley, Jeff Hughes, Don Fairfield and Maha Ashour-Abdalla. He was also a supporter of proposed missions and facilities that were used by the next generation of scientists, such as the European Incoherent Scatter (EISCAT) radars and the European Space Agency's Cluster multi-spacecraft mission. Dungey authored the first proposal for Cluster, calling it TOPS, "Tetrahedral observatory probe system". That was in 1966, 30 years before the first attempt to launch Cluster on board the ill-fated Ariane flight V88 of Ariane 5 and 34 years before the spacecraft mission was successfully launched.

=== Awards and honours ===
- 1982 Chapman Medal from the Royal Astronomical Society
- 1990 Gold Medal of the Royal Astronomical Society
- 1991 Fleming Medal from the American Geophysical Union
- 1994 Honorary member of the European Geophysical Society (now the European Geosciences Union).

The James Dungey Lecture is presented annually in his honour by the Royal Astronomical Society.
