= Caludon Castle School =

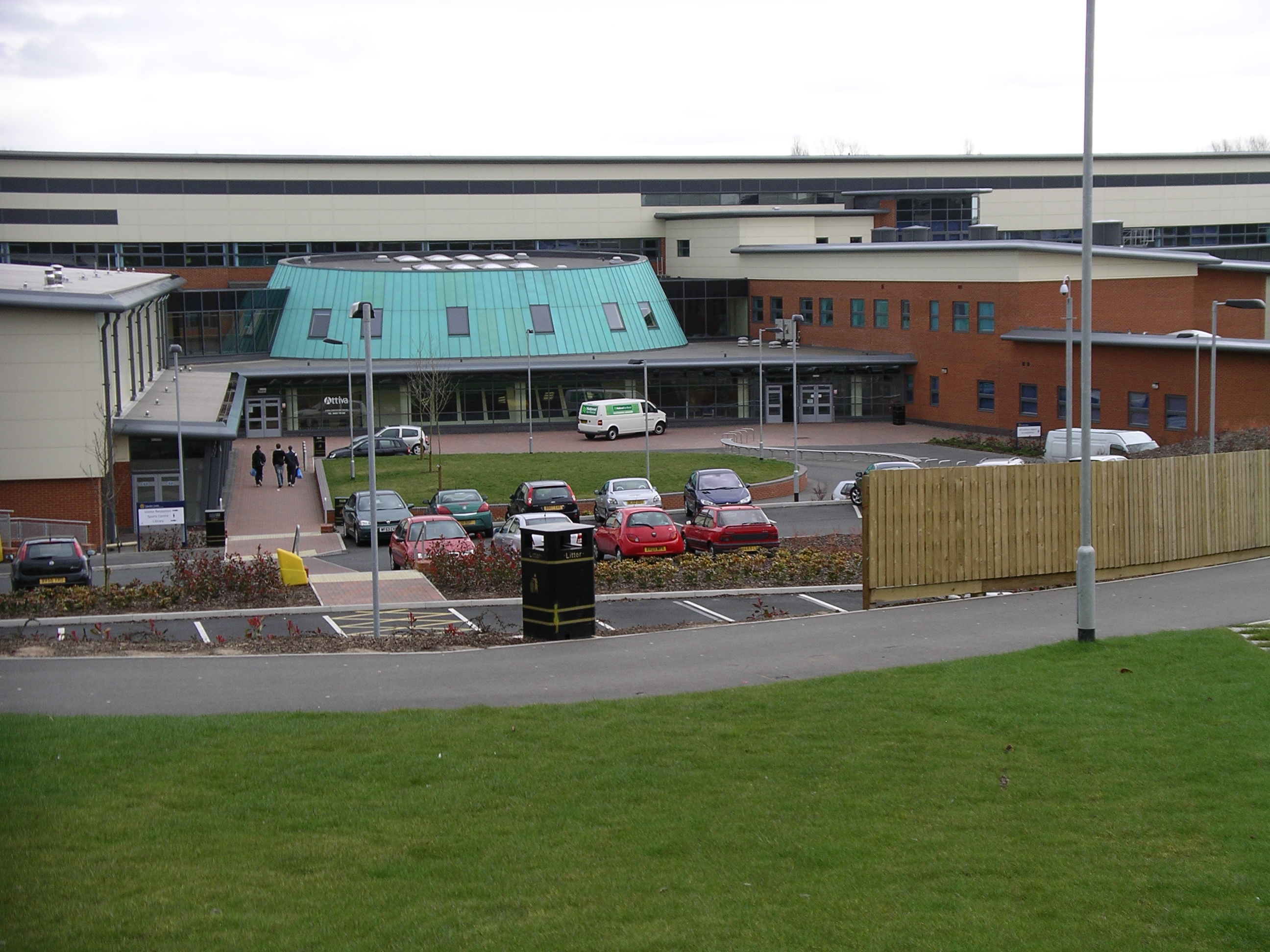

Location
- Axholme Road; Coventry, West Midlands, CV2 5BD; England; 52.4136°N 1.4515°W

Information
- Type: Comprehensive; Academy
- Motto: 'Respect to all, from all'
- Established: 1954
- Local authority: Coventry City Council
- Trust: Castle Phoenix Trust
- Department for Education URN: 139292 Tables
- Ofsted: Reports
- Headteacher: Sarah Kenrick
- Associate Headteacher: Ann Dudgeon
- Gender: Coeducational
- Age: 11 to 18
- Enrolment: 1,437 (approx.)
- Colours: red, yellow, and white
- Website: http://www.caludoncastle.co.uk/

Caludon Castle School is an academy in Wyken, Coventry, England. The school was founded in 1954 as a boys' comprehensive school, but is now a co-educational 11-18 comprehensive school with a sixth form. In September 2004, the school was designated as a Business and Enterprise College, by the Specialist Schools and Academies Trust. The previous buildings dating from the 1950s were demolished to make way for a new £24 million PFI project resulting in the school being totally rebuilt. The school is situated on a 67-acre (270,000 m^{2}) site.

== Notable staff ==
Former

- Tom O'Carroll (born 1945), paedophilia advocate

== Notable alumni ==
- Adam Balding (born 1979), Rugby Union player with Newcastle Falcons
- Ron Cook (born 1948), actor
- Stan Cowley, FRS (born 1947), Professor of Solar Planetary Physics at the University of Leicester.
- Marlon Devonish (born 1976), Olympic gold medalist - 4 × 100 m - Athens 2004, World Indoor Champion - 200m - 2003
- Ian Evatt (born 19 November 1981) footballer
- Bobby Gould (born 1946), former footballer who is now a manager
- Paul King (born 20 November 1960), British singer, musician, VJ, and TV presenter. Member of the mid 80's band 'King'
- Navin Kundra (born 1985), musician
- Guy James (born 1970), West End Actor and Musician, member of band 'Jackdaw4', now Theatre Producer of The Osmonds Musical and The Addams Family and Creator of MoxieRadio.Online.
- James Maddison (born 1996), Footballer for Tottenham Hotspur
- Ian Muir (born 1963), former footballer
- Bobby Parker (born 11 November 1952), former footballer
- Jamie Paterson (born 1991), Professional football player, currently playing for Plymouth Argyle, formerly of Bristol City, Nottingham Forest, Huddersfield, Walsall, Swansea and Coventry City
- Rachel Smith (born 1993), Captain of the GB Rhythmic Gymnastic Team, 2012 Olympics
- Pete Waterman, record producer
