= Mike Lockwood (physicist) =

British physicist

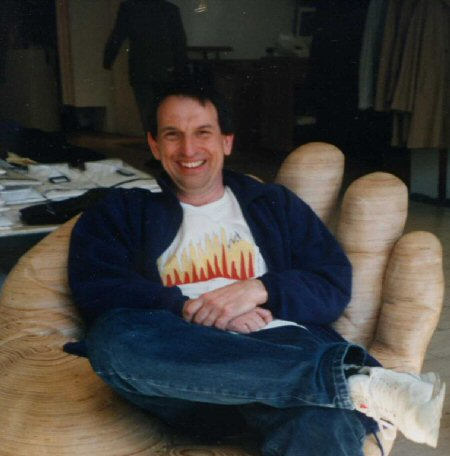
Michael Lockwood

Michael Lockwood FRS (born 1954) is a Professor of Space Environment Physics at the University of Reading.

== Life and works ==
Schooled at The Skinners' School, Tunbridge Wells, he earned his BSc (1975) and then PhD (1978) degrees at the University of Exeter. Much of his career has been with Rutherford Appleton Laboratory but he has also worked at University of Southampton, NASA's Marshall Space Flight Center and University of Auckland. His research interests comprise, among others, variations in the magnetic fields of the Sun, interplanetary space, and the Earth and in general solar influence on global and regional climate. He has served as the Chair of the Council of EISCAT and as a Council member for the British Natural Environment Research Council.

His lectures, at the Saas-Fee Advanced Course The Sun, Solar Analogs and the Climate, together with contributions of such experts as Joanna Haigh and Mark Giampapa, were published as a book by Springer in 2006.

He played football during his postdoctoral studies in a team called the Merry Pranksters of Exeter University. He plays guitar for the band Dumber than Chickens.

== Positions on solar influence on global and regional climate ==
In 2007, Lockwood co-authored a paper about solar data from the past 40 years. He was partly inspired to conduct the study after seeing the Great Global Warming Swindle, which contends that the Sun is the primary cause of recent climate change. He found that between 1985 and 1987 all the solar factors that could affect climate performed a "U-turn in every possible way". Lockwood told the New Scientist that he seriously doubted that solar influences were a big factor compared to anthropogenic influences: to explain the lack of global cooling since 1987 would require a very long response time to any solar forcing which is not found in detected responses to volcanic forcing.

However, Lockwood has stressed the distinction between global, regional and seasonal climate changes and is of the opinion that solar modulation of the winter, northern hemisphere jet stream might well result in Europe experiencing a higher fraction of cold winters. From past variations of the Sun deduced from cosmogenic isotopes he concludes that a slide into a new Maunder Minimum is possible over the next 50–100 years. The biggest impact of such a decline in solar activity would be a higher occurrence frequency of relatively cold winters in the UK and across Europe, each of which would be accompanied by a relatively warm one elsewhere (for example in Greenland).

In 2012, Lockwood said the field of Sun-climate relations had been "corrupted by unwelcome political and financial influence as climate change sceptics have seized upon putative solar effects as an excuse for inaction on anthropogenic warming".

== Awards ==
- 1990 The Zel'dovich Award for Commission C (Ionospheric Physics), awarded by the Russian Academy of Sciences and the Committee on Space Research (COSPAR), of the International Council of Scientific Unions
- 1990 The Issac Koga Gold Medal, awarded by the International Union of Radio Science (URSI)
- 1998 The Chapman Medal, awarded by the Royal Astronomical Society, London
- 2003 The Charles Chree (now renamed the Appleton) Award and Prize, awarded by the Institute of Physics, London
- 2006 Elected as a Fellow of the Royal Society of London
- 2012 The Julius Bartels Medal, awarded by the European Geosciences Union
- 2015 The Gold Medal of the Royal Astronomical Society for Geophysics

== Works ==
- M. Lockwood, The study of HF radio waves propagated over a long, sub-auroral path, Exeter University, UK, 1978 (http://lib.exeter.ac.uk/record=b1308620~S6)
- Saas-Fe Book (2004), J.D. Haigh, M. Lockwood and M.S. Giampapa, The Sun, Solar Analogs and the Climate, Springer, ISBN 3-540-23856-5, 2004
- M. Lockwood Reconstruction and Prediction of Variations in the Open Solar Magnetic Flux and Interplanetary Conditions, Living Reviews in Solar Physics, 10, 4, 2013. doi:10.12942/lrsp-2013-4
- M. Lockwood, Solar Influence on Global and Regional Climate, Surveys in Geophysics, 33 (3), 503–534, 2012. doi:10.1007/s10712-012-9181-3
- M. Lockwood et al., The rise and fall of open solar flux during the current grand solar maximum, Ap. J., 700 (2), 937–944, 2009. doi:10.1088/0004-637X/700/2/937
- M. Lockwood et al., A doubling of the sun's coronal magnetic field during the last 100 years, Nature, 399, 437–439, 1999. doi:10.1038/20867
- S.W.H. Cowley and M. Lockwood, Excitation and decay of solar-wind driven flows in the magnetosphere-ionosphere system, Annales Geophys., 10, 103–115, 1992.
- M. Lockwood et al., Ionospheric signatures of pulsed magnetic reconnection at the Earth's magnetopause, Nature, 361 (6411), 424–428, 1993 doi:10.1038/361424a0, 1993
- M. Lockwood et al., Non-Maxwellian ion velocity distributions observed using EISCAT, Geophys. Res. Lett., 14, 111–114, 1987. doi:10.1029/GL014i002p00111
- M. Lockwood et al., The geomagnetic mass spectrometer – mass and energy dispersions of ionospheric ion flows into the magnetosphere, Nature, 316, 612–613, 1985. doi:10.1038/316612a0
- more than 400 journal publications
