= Ineke De Moortel =

Belgian mathematician

Ineke De Moortel FRAS FRSE (born in 1975) is a Belgian applied mathematician in Scotland, where she is a professor of applied mathematics at the University of St Andrews, director of research in the School of Mathematics and Statistics at St Andrews, and president of the Edinburgh Mathematical Society. Her research concerns the computational and mathematical modelling of solar physics, and particularly of the Sun's corona. She has been awarded the Philip Leverhulme Prize in Astronomy and Astrophysics. She is a Fellow of the Royal Society of Edinburgh, of the Royal Astronomical Society.

== Education and career ==
De Moortel earned a master's degree in mathematics in 1997 at KU Leuven. She completed a Ph.D. in solar physics in 2001 at the University of St Andrews; her dissertation, Theoretical & Observational Aspects of Wave Propagation in the Solar Corona, was supervised by Alan Hood. She remained at St Andrews as a postdoctoral researcher and research fellow, becoming a reader there in 2008 and a professor of applied mathematics in 2013. Her research concerns the computational and mathematical modelling of solar physics, and particularly of the Sun's corona.

De Moortel is president of the Edinburgh Mathematical Society. Since 2019 she has been a member of the editorial board at the journal Monthly Notices of the Royal Astronomical Society. De Moortel sits on the judging panel for the St Andrews Prize for the Environment.

== Recognition ==
In 2005, De Moortel became a Fellow of the Royal Astronomical Society. In 2009 she won the Philip Leverhulme Prize in Astronomy and Astrophysics. She was elected to the Royal Society of Edinburgh in 2015, and previously co-chaired its affiliate society, the Young Academy of Scotland. She was featured in the Royal Society of Edinburgh's 2019 exhibition Women in Science in Scotland, which celebrated some of Scotland’s leading female scientists.
