= Steven Jay Schwartz =

American/British physicist (born 1951)

- Born: September 15, 1951 (age 74); Warren, Pennsylvania
- Education: Cornell University; Cambridge University
- Scientific career
- Fields: Space physics
- Workplaces: Imperial College London

Steven Jay Schwartz (born September 15, 1951) is a professor of space physics at Imperial College London. He was awarded the Chapman Medal of the Royal Astronomical Society in 2006 "in recognition of his pioneering work in solar terrestrial physics and space plasma physics". In 2009, he became the head of the Space and Atmospheric Physics Group at Imperial College London.

In 2017 Schwartz won the Institute of Physics Cecilia Payne-Gaposchkin Medal and Prize.

Schwartz is responsible for refuting the belief that cosmic rays trapped by self-excited turbulence within a supernova remnant cool irreversibly as the remnant expands. He has also significantly contributed to theoretical and observational analysis of collisionless shocks within the heliosphere. His work on the "quasi-parallel shock", the component of the Earth's bow shock believed to be responsible for particle heating and acceleration, first theorized in the early 1990s, was later confirmed by observations from the Cluster spacecraft.

Schwartz is the UK Project Scientist for the UK Cluster Science Centre, co-investigator for the PEACE electron instrumentation, CIS ion instrument and the FGM magnetometer.
