= Emma Bunce =

British physicist

Emma Bunce OBE
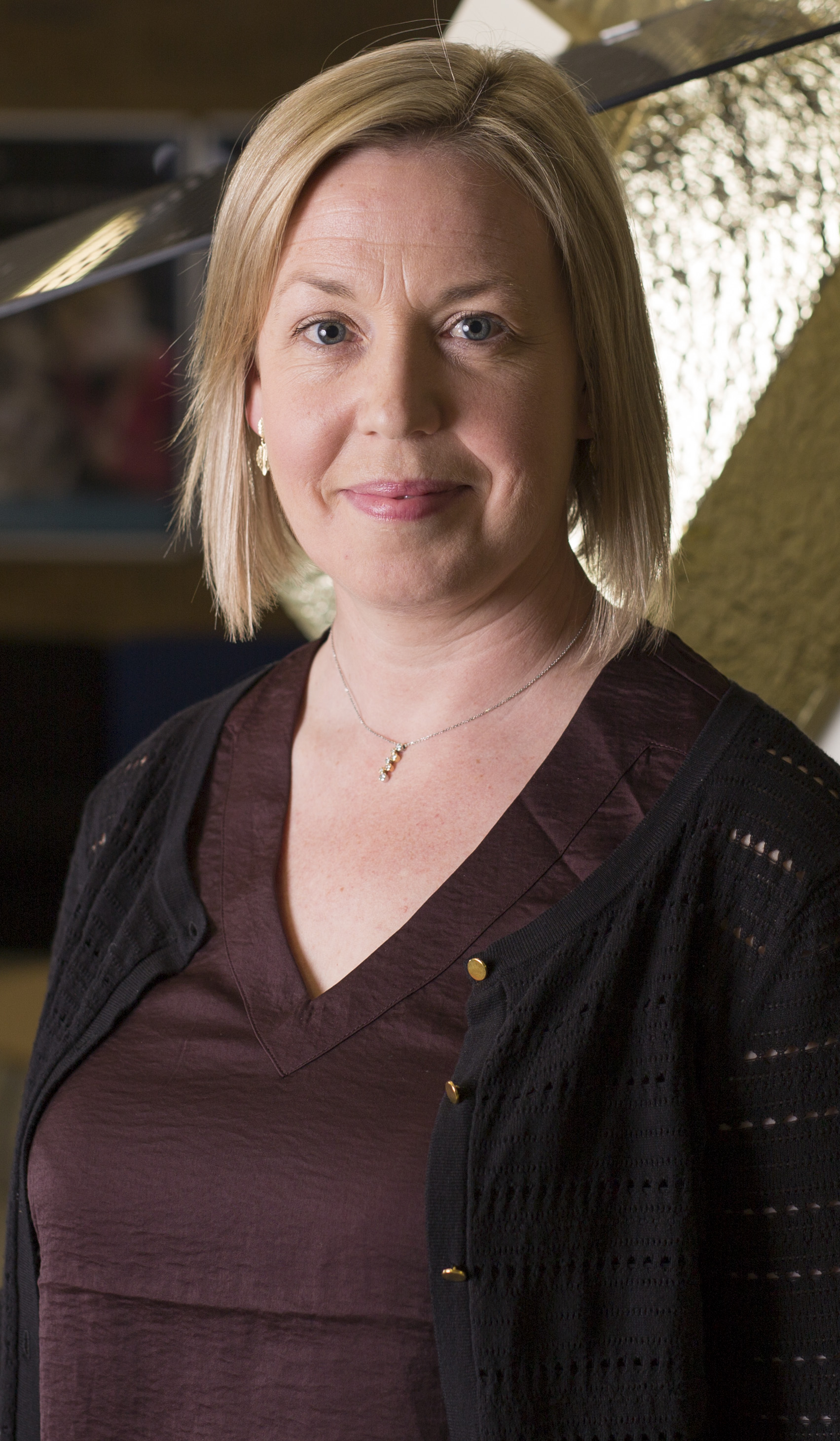
- Bunce in 2016

92nd President of the Royal Astronomical Society
- In office 26 June 2020 – May 2022
- Preceded by: Mike Cruise

Personal details
- Born: Emma J. Bunce; 1975 (age 50–51)
- Scientific career
- Education: Davison High School; Worthing College; University of Leicester (MPhys, PhD)
- Awards: Chapman Medal (2018); Philip Leverhulme Prize (2011); Royal Society Wolfson Research Merit Award
- Fields: Planetary science Planetary magnetospheres
- Workplaces: University of Leicester
- Thesis: Large-scale current systems in the Jovian magnetosphere (2001)
- Doctoral advisor: Stan Cowley
- Website: le.ac.uk/people/emma-bunce

Emma J. Bunce OBE (born 1975) is a British space physicist and Professor of Planetary Plasma Physics in the School of Physics and Astronomy at the University of Leicester. She holds a Royal Society Wolfson Research Merit Award. Her research is on the magnetospheres of Saturn and Jupiter. She is principal investigator (PI) of the MIXS instrument on BepiColombo, was deputy lead on the Jupiter Icy Moons Explorer proposal, and co-investigator on the Cassini–Huygens mission.

Bunce served as President of the Royal Astronomical Society from 26 June 2020 to May 2022.

== Early life and education ==
Bunce grew up in Worthing. In 1989, she watched the Horizon documentary on Neptune with images taken by Voyager 2 and was inspired to become a space scientist.

She was educated at Davison High School (a C of E girls school) and Worthing College (a sixth form college), where she graduated in 1994. She studied physics with space science at the University of Leicester and earned her Master of Physics (MPhys) degree in 1998.

In 1998, Bunce began her doctoral training with Stan Cowley, investigating the magnetosphere of Jupiter. Her thesis, Large-scale current systems in the Jovian Magnetosphere, looked at the radial current systems of the middle magnetosphere of Jupiter. She used data from Pioneer 10, Pioneer 11, Voyager 1, Voyager 2 and Ulysses. The interaction between Jupiter and the surrounding plasma environment is influenced by the magnetic field. On Jupiter, the plasma is mainly produced in the volcanic moon Io.

== Research and career ==
After her graduate studies, Bunce worked as a postdoctoral researcher investigating the Kronian magnetosphere of Saturn in preparation for Cassini–Huygens. In 2003, Bunce was awarded a Particle Physics and Astronomy Research Council fellowship to study the magnetosphere of Saturn. She continued to study Jupiter's polar auroral emissions. She was appointed to the faculty at the University of Leicester in 2005.

Bunce was part of the Cassini–Huygens magnetometer team. She was the first to analyse the UV aurorae of Saturn using the Hubble Space Telescope. The magnetosphere of Saturn rotates rapidly and plasma is produced via sputter of the icy moons. She monitored the magnetospheric currents of Saturn in situ, identifying that there was a connection between the auroral oval and upward-directed field-aligned currents that flow near open and closed field lines. She observed the interaction of the solar wind with the magnetosphere of Saturn. In 2009, she was elected to the Royal Astronomical Society Council and delivered the society's Harold Jeffreys Lecture. She discussed her work Jupiter-like aurorae found on Saturn.

She was promoted to reader in 2009 and professor in 2013. She organised a celebration of ten years of Cassini–Huygens in 2014. She is the Principal Investigator of the Mercury Imaging X-ray Spectrometer (MIXS) instrument. MIXS was built in Leicester, launched in 2015 and will travel to Mercury. She delivered the 2016 National Space Academy keynote lecture. She is the principal investigator of the Mercury Imaging X-ray Spectrometer instrument on the European Space Agency BepiColombo mission (to Mercury) and deputy lead on the Jupiter Icy Moons Explorer. BepiColombo will help to explain some of the mysteries of Mercury, including finding volatile sulphur and potassium. She contributed to the book Mathematical Methods for the Physical Sciences: A University Level Introduction in 2018.

Bunce was elected President of the Royal Astronomical Society in 2019; she began her term on 26 June 2020 and served two years.

=== Public engagement ===
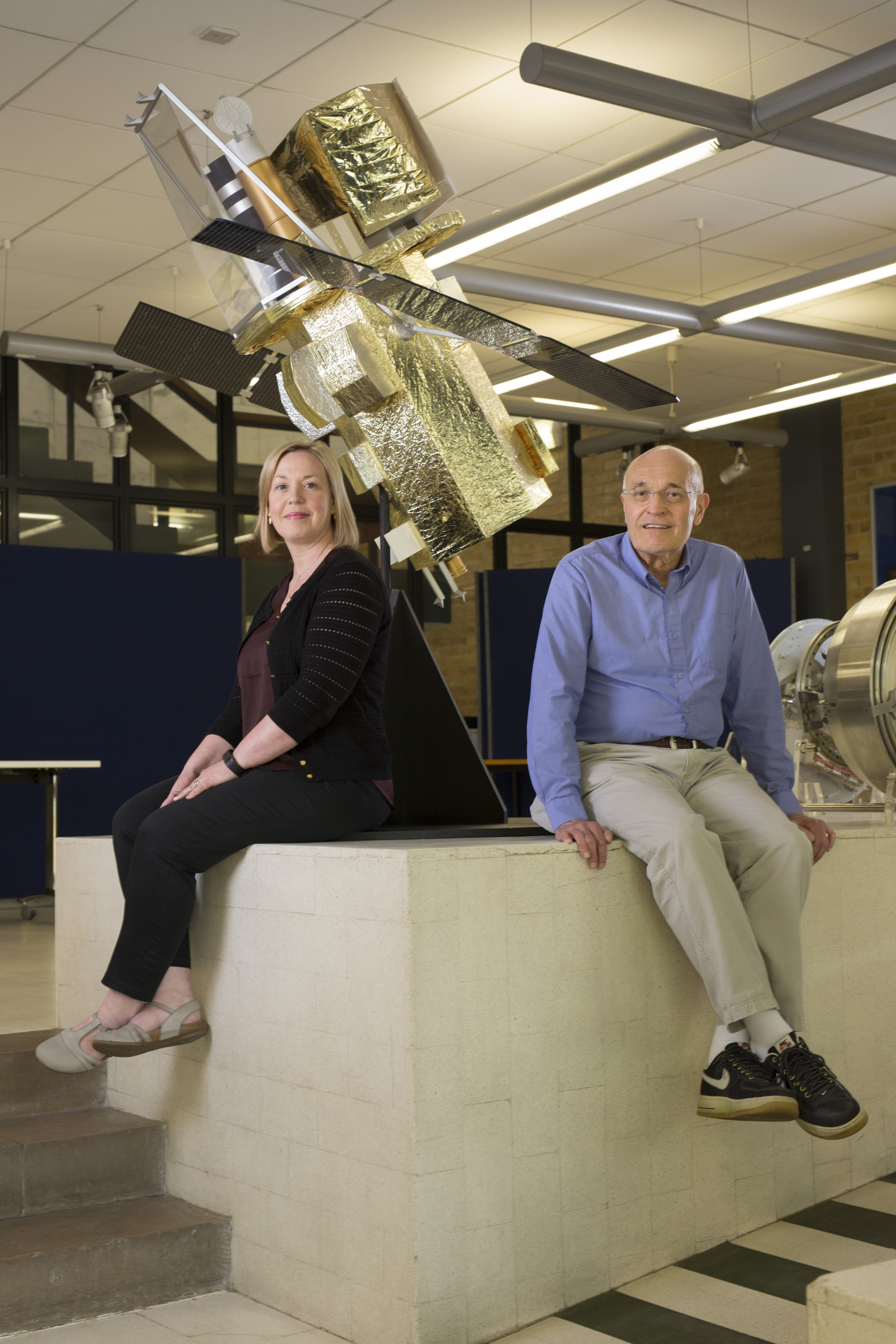
Emma Bunce in 2016 with Stan Cowley

Bunce has delivered several popular science lectures. She has written for The Conversation.

She spoke at the New Scientist Live event in 2018.

She was a guest on the BBC Radio 4 programme The Life Scientific in June 2020.

=== Honours and awards ===
Bunce was appointed Officer of the Order of the British Empire (OBE) in the 2024 New Year Honours for services to astronomy and science education.

Her other awards and honours include:

- 2020–2022 – President of the Royal Astronomical Society
- 2018 – Chapman Medal
- 2011 – Philip Leverhulme Prize for Astronomy and Astrophysics
- 2009 – Harold Jeffreys Lecture
- 2005 – European Geophysical Union Young Talents in Geoscience Award
- 2003 – French Academy of Sciences Prix Baron Nicolet award for space physics
- 2002 – awarded the Royal Astronomical Society Blackwell Prize
