= Sandra Chapman =

British astrophysicist

Sandra Catherine Chapman
- Education: University of London; Imperial College London (Ph.D., D.I.C) (BSc, A.R.C.S.)
- Scientific career
- Workplaces: University of Warwick
- Thesis: Lithium releases in the near earth plasma environment. (1985)

Sandra C. Chapman CPhysis FInstP FRAS a British astrophysicist who is Professor of Physics and Director of the Centre for Fusion, Space and Astrophysics at the University of Warwick. Her research considers nonlinear physics and planetary magnetospheres.

== Early life and education ==
Chapman studied physics at Imperial College London, where she was awarded an Exhibition Scholarship. She was diagnosed with temporal lobe epilepsy during her undergraduate degree. She remained at Imperial for her doctoral research, which considered the release of lithium in the near Earth plasma environment.

== Research and career ==
Chapman joined the University of Warwick in 1995. In 2000 she became the first woman to become a professor of physics at the University of Warwick.

Chapman studies the dynamical interactions of planetary magnetospheres. She has shown that they release energy in unpredictable intervals, and behave as multi-scale, coupled systems. Her research on magnetic storms informed the strategy of the Magnetospheric Multiscale Mission. Alongside her scientific research, Chapman is an artist, and in 2003 held a NESTA fellowship to create art with the British Antarctic Survey.

To perform her investigations, Chapman makes use of non-linear physics. She has applied her understanding to the aurora, to quantify the risk of extreme space weather and to better understand solar activity. In 2017, she was awarded a Fulbright Program Fellowship to spend a year at Boston University and identify ways to protect the planet from space weather.

Chapman was a 2003-2004 Harvard Radcliffe Institute Fellow and the International Space Science Institute 2023 Johannes Geiss Fellow.

In 2022, Chapman was awarded the Royal Astronomical Society Chapman Medal.

== Awards and honours ==
- 1993 EGS Young Scientists' Medal
- 1994 COSPAR Commission D Zeldovich Medal
- 2014 Royal Astronomical Society James Dungey Lecture
- 2017 Fulbright-Lloyd's of London Scholar
- 2020 American Geophysical Union Ed Lorenz Lecture
- 2021 Lloyd's of London Science of Risk Prize
- 2022 Royal Astronomical Society Chapman Medal
- 2024 European Geosciences Union Hannes Alfvén Medal

== Selected publications ==
- H. Karimabadi; V. Roytershteyn; M. Wan; et al. (2013). "Coherent structures, intermittent turbulence, and dissipation in high-temperature plasmas". Physics of Plasmas. 20 (1): 012303. doi:10.1063/1.4773205. Wikidata Q60707157.
- K H Kiyani; S C Chapman; Yu V Khotyaintsev; M W Dunlop; F Sahraoui (2009). "Global scale-invariant dissipation in collisionless plasma turbulence". Physical Review Letters. 103 (7) 075006. arXiv:0906.2830. doi:10.1103/physrevlett.103.075006. PMID 19792654. Wikidata Q60707278.
- X. Litaudon; S. Abduallev; M. Abhangi; et al. (2017). "Overview of the JET results in support to ITER". Nuclear Fusion. 57 (10): 102001. doi:10.1088/1741-4326/aa5e28. Wikidata Q57645458.
