= Caitriona Jackman =

Irish space physicist

Caitríona Jackman
- Born: Caitríona M. Jackman
- Education: University of Limerick (BSc); University of Leicester (PhD)
- Scientific career
- Workplaces: Dublin Institute for Advanced Studies; Imperial College London; University College London; University of Southampton
- Thesis: Solar wind-magnetosphere coupling at Saturn (2006)
- Doctoral advisor: Stan Cowley
- Website: www.dias.ie/2019/11/27/professor-caitriona-jackman

Caitríona M. Jackman is an Irish space physicist. In 2021, she became the first female senior professor at the Dublin Institute for Advanced Studies (DIAS) Dunsink Observatory. She has made important contributions to understanding the solar wind interactions with planetary magnetospheres.

== Education and early life ==
Jackman gained a Bachelor of Science degree in Applied Physics from the University of Limerick in 2003. She then completed a PhD degree in Planetary Physics at the University of Leicester in 2006 supervised by Stan Cowley.

== Career and research ==
After her doctorate, Jackman undertook research roles at Imperial College London and University College London. In 2013, she moved to the University of Southampton in lecturer and, later, associate professor roles. In 2021, she was appointed senior professor and head of DIAS planetary magnetospheres group.

Jackman's research focuses on the physics of planetary magnetospheres, primarily of the Earth and Jupiter. She has made key discoveries about the response of the Earth and Jupiter magnetosphere systems to the changes in the solar wind, in particular how the aurora works, and how machine learning and complexity science can be used to study huge volumes of data from space. She is also involved in a number of outreach activities, including Ireland's first space-themed escape room, designed to make space accessible to a wider audience.

=== Awards and honours ===
- Leverhulme Trust fellowship on "Energy release from magnetospheres", hosted by University College London, 2010
- Royal Astronomical Society fellowship, hosted by University College London, 2013
- STFC Ernest Rutherford fellowship, hosted by University of Southampton, 2014
- Served on Science and Technology Facilities Council (STFC) Solar System Advisory Panel, 2015
- Elected as councillor of the Royal Astronomical Society, 2015
- Fellow of the Alan Turing Institute, 2016
- Member of European Space Agency Solar System and Exploration Working Group, 2021
