= Louise Harra =

British physicist

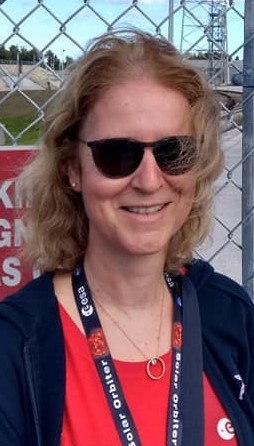
- Harra in 2020
- Education: The Queen's University of Belfast, B.Sc.
- Scientific career
- Fields: Astrophysics
- Workplaces: ETH Zurich

Louise Harra is a Northern Irish physicist, born in Lurgan, County Armagh, Northern Ireland. She is the Director of the World Radiation Centre of the Physical Meteorological Observatory in Davos (PMOD/WRC) and affiliated professor at the Institute of Particle Physics and Astrophysics of ETH Zurich.

== Education ==
Louise Harra was born in County Armagh, and she attended later Banbridge Academy.

She graduated from The Queen's University of Belfast with a BSc (Hons) in Applied Maths and Physics and a PhD in Physics.

== Academic career and research interests ==
She was a professor of solar physics at University College, London's Mullard Space Science Laboratory until 2019, with much of her career being involved in space instruments. She was principal investigator (PI) of the EUV Imaging Spectrometer instrument on the Hinode spacecraft from 2006 to 2019. She is co-PI of the Solar Orbiter EUV Imager.

In 2019 she moved to take on the position of director at PMOD/WRC and affiliated professor at ETH Zurich.

Harra's research interests include solar flares and coronal mass ejections, formation of the solar wind and Sun-Earth connection. Her research makes use of spectroscopic and imaging observations to quantify the characteristics and behaviour of solar flares and the solar wind.

== Space missions ==
Harra has been involved in a number of space missions in her career. These include:

- The Japanese/US/UK space mission Yohkoh, Instrument Scientist based in Japan.
- The JAXA/NASA/UK/ESA mission Hinode, Principal Investigator of the EUV Imaging Spectrometer.
- The ESA/NASA Solar Orbiter mission, co-Principal Investigator for the EUV Imager.

== Media ==
Harra has given radio and TV interviews. These include:

- 2014 Radio 4, 'In our time' interview with Melvyn Bragg
- 2014 Australian Broadcasting Corporation Science Show with Robyn Williams

== Awards ==
- 2023:Institute of Physics Cecilia Payne-Gaposchkin Medal and Prize.
- 2017: Robinson medal presented by Armagh Observatory.
- 2016: Daiwa-Adrian prize for UK-Japan research.
- 2015: RAS group achievement award for the Hinode EIS instrument.
- 2014: The Sir Arthur Clarke Award, Space Achievement (Academic Study/Research) for her leadership in the UK and internationally of the exploitation of data from the Japanese Hinode spacecraft and her leadership of the upcoming EUI telescope on Solar Orbiter.
- 2014: The Royal Astronomical Society's Chapman Medal, for single investigations of outstanding merit in solar-terrestrial physics, including geomagnetism and aeronomy.
- 2003: Philip Leverhulme Award– this award, in the Astronomy and Astrophysics category, recognises young scholars of substantial distinction and promise.

== See also ==
- List of women in leadership positions on astronomical instrumentation projects
