= Dungey Cycle =

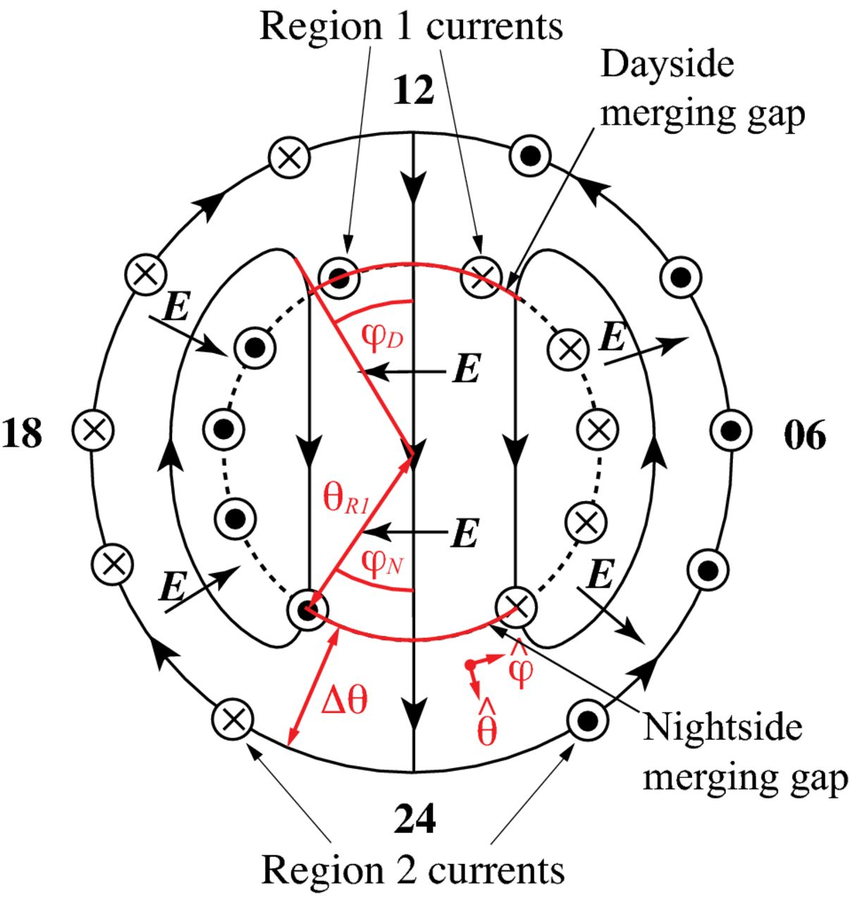
Schematic of the Dungey cycle flow mapped into the ionosphere

The Dungey cycle, officially proposed by James Dungey in 1961, is a phenomenon that explains interactions between a planet's magnetosphere and solar wind. Dungey originally proposed a cyclic behavior of magnetic reconnection between Earth's magnetosphere and flux of solar wind. This reconnection explained previously observed dynamics within Earth's magnetosphere. The rate of reconnection in the beginning of the cycle is dependent on the orientation of the interplanetary magnetic field as well as the resultant plasma conditions at the site of reconnection. On Earth, the reconnection cycle takes around 1 hour, but this differs from planet to planet.

== Cyclic Behavior ==
The Dungey cycle occurs within three stages:

1. In the first stage, solar flux and the magnetopause connect, creating an opening in the magnetopause in which the solar wind can enter the magnetosphere. This opening is called the dayside reconnection and occurs on the side of the magnetosphere facing the solar wind source.
2. In the second stage, the flux travels in the direction of the solar wind across the magnetosphere.
3. In the third stage, at the magnetotail, reconnection closes the open flux, allowing for a new cycle to begin. This reconnection is called nightside reconnection.

Dungey's proposal originally put forth an explanation that the cycle is at steady state, and that the reconnection during stage one and three are equal. However, later work has found that the rate of reconnection is variable and affected by conditions at both the dayside reconnection site as well as the magnetotail.

== Effect of interplanetary magnetic field orientation ==
The rate of reconnection at the magnetopause is heavily dependent on the orientation of the interplanetary magnetic field. Reconnection at the magnetopause occurs at higher rates when there is a stronger southward component to the field. This allows for solar wind with arbitrarily small shear angles to reconnect at the magnetopause. Under normal circumstances, the difference in field strength between the magnetopause and the surrounding fields only allow for solar winds with large shear angles to reconnect. A strong southward component normalizes the difference in field strength between the magnetopause and surrounding fields.
