= Magnetosheath =

Region of a magnetosphere which cannot fully deflect charged particles

The magnetosheath is the region of space between the magnetopause and the bow shock of a planet's magnetosphere. The regularly organized magnetic field generated by the planet becomes weak and irregular in the magnetosheath due to interaction with the incoming solar wind, and is incapable of fully deflecting the highly charged particles. The density of the particles in this region is considerably lower than what is found beyond the bow shock, but greater than within the magnetopause, and can be considered a transitory state.

Schematic of Earth's magnetosphere, showing the relative position of the magnetosheath

Scientific research into the exact nature of the magnetosheath has been limited due to a longstanding misconception that it was a byproduct of the bow shock/magnetopause interaction and had no inherently important properties of its own. Recent studies indicate, however, that the magnetosheath is a dynamic region of turbulent plasma flow which may play an important role in the structure of the bow shock and the magnetopause, and might help to dictate the flow of energetic particles across those boundaries. Kinetic plasma instabilities may cause further complexity by generating plasma waves and energetic particle beams in the magnetosheath and foreshock regions.

The Earth's magnetosheath typically occupies the region of space approximately 10 Earth radii on the upwind (Sun-facing) side of the planet, extending significantly further out on the downwind side due to the pressure of the solar wind. The exact location and width of the magnetosheath depends on variables such as solar activity.

The magnetosheath hosts various transient phenomena that significantly affect its dynamics. High-speed magnetosheath jets are localized regions of enhanced dynamic pressure that can travel at speeds exceeding the ambient magnetosheath flow, impacting the magnetopause and driving geomagnetic activity. Additionally, the magnetosheath is permeated by various plasma waves and fluctuations. These waves and instabilities contribute to the turbulent nature of the magnetosheath and can affect particle acceleration and transport.

== See also ==
- Earth's magnetic field
- Interplanetary magnetic field (IMF)
- Magnetotail
- Van Allen radiation belt
- Plasmasphere
- Ionosphere
- Space weather and heliophysics
