= Stan Cowley =

British physicist

Stan Cowley FRS
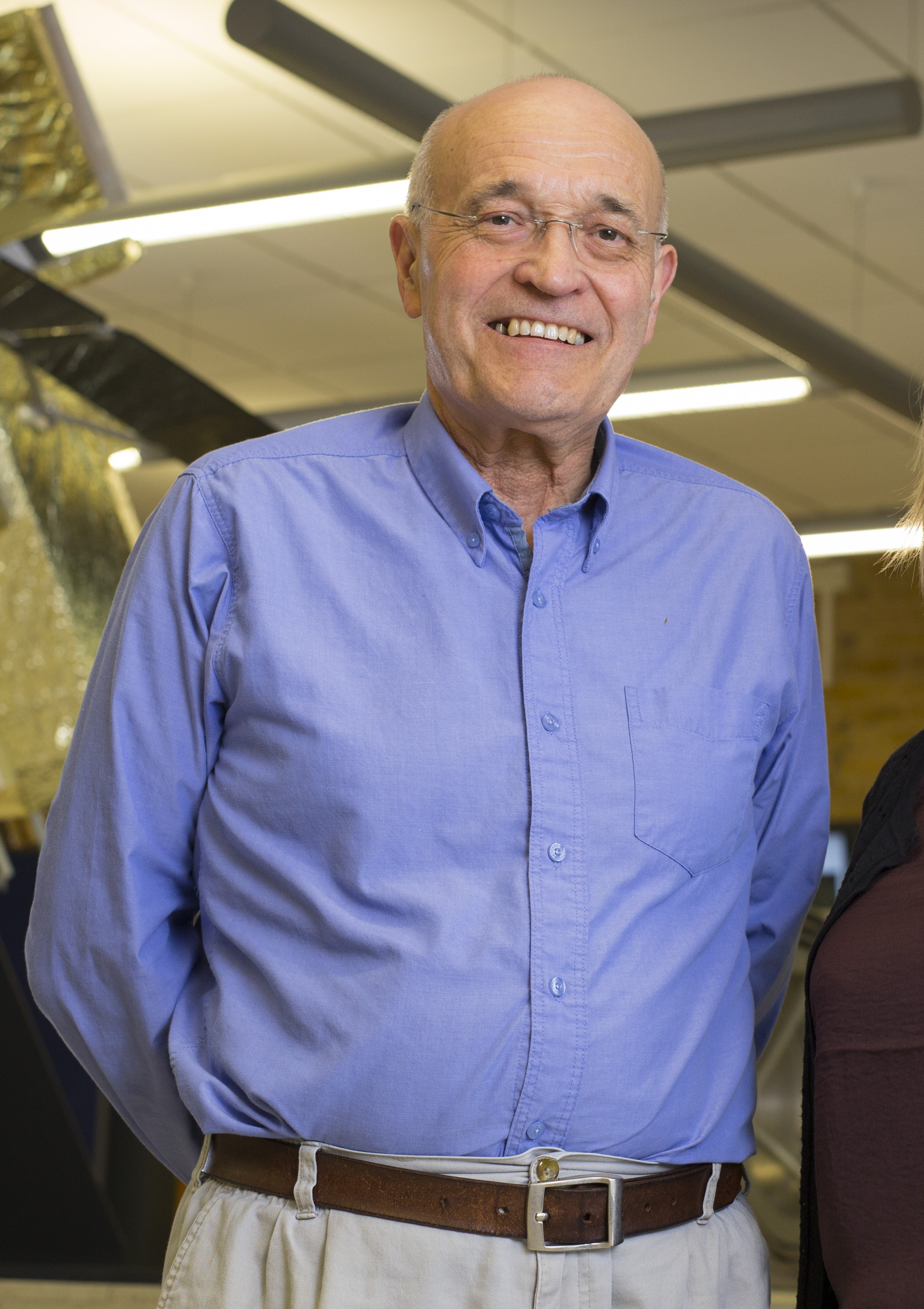
- Stan Cowley in 2016
- Born: Stanley William Herbert Cowley; 1947 (age 78–79)
- Education: Caludon Castle School; Imperial College London (PhD)
- Awards: Chapman Medal (1991); Gold Medal of the Royal Astronomical Society (2006)
- Scientific career
- Fields: Solar-planetary physics
- Workplaces: University of Colorado; University of Leicester
- Thesis: Self-consistent models of magnetic neutral sheets (1972)
- Academic advisors: James Dungey
- Doctoral students: Emma Bunce; Nicola Fox; Caitriona Jackman
- Website: le.ac.uk/people/stanley-cowley

Stanley William Herbert Cowley FRS (born 1947) is a British physicist, and Emeritus Professor of Solar Planetary Physics at the University of Leicester.

== Education ==
Cowley was educated at Caludon Castle School, Coventry, and Imperial College, London, graduating with first-class honours in physics in 1968. He was awarded a PhD degree by Imperial in 1972 for research supervised by James Dungey.

== Career and research ==
Cowley had a visiting scholarship at the University of Colorado in 1972–73 before returning to Imperial, where was appointed lecturer in 1982, reader in 1985 and professor in 1988. He was appointed Head of the Space and Atmospheric Physics Group at Imperial in 1990 before moving in 1996 to the University of Leicester as Head of the Radio and Space Plasma Physics group.

Cowley's primary research interest is the physical processes that shape the outer plasma environments of Earth and the magnetised planets.

Cowley's former doctoral students include Emma Bunce, Nicola Fox, and Caitriona Jackman.

=== Honours and awards ===
- 2011: Elected a Fellow of the Royal Society (FRS)
- 2006: Awarded the Julius Bartels Medal by the European Geosciences Union
- 2006: Awarded the Gold Medal of the Royal Astronomical Society for Geophysics
- 1995: Elected a Fellow of the American Geophysical Union
- 1991: Awarded the Chapman Medal by the Royal Astronomical Society

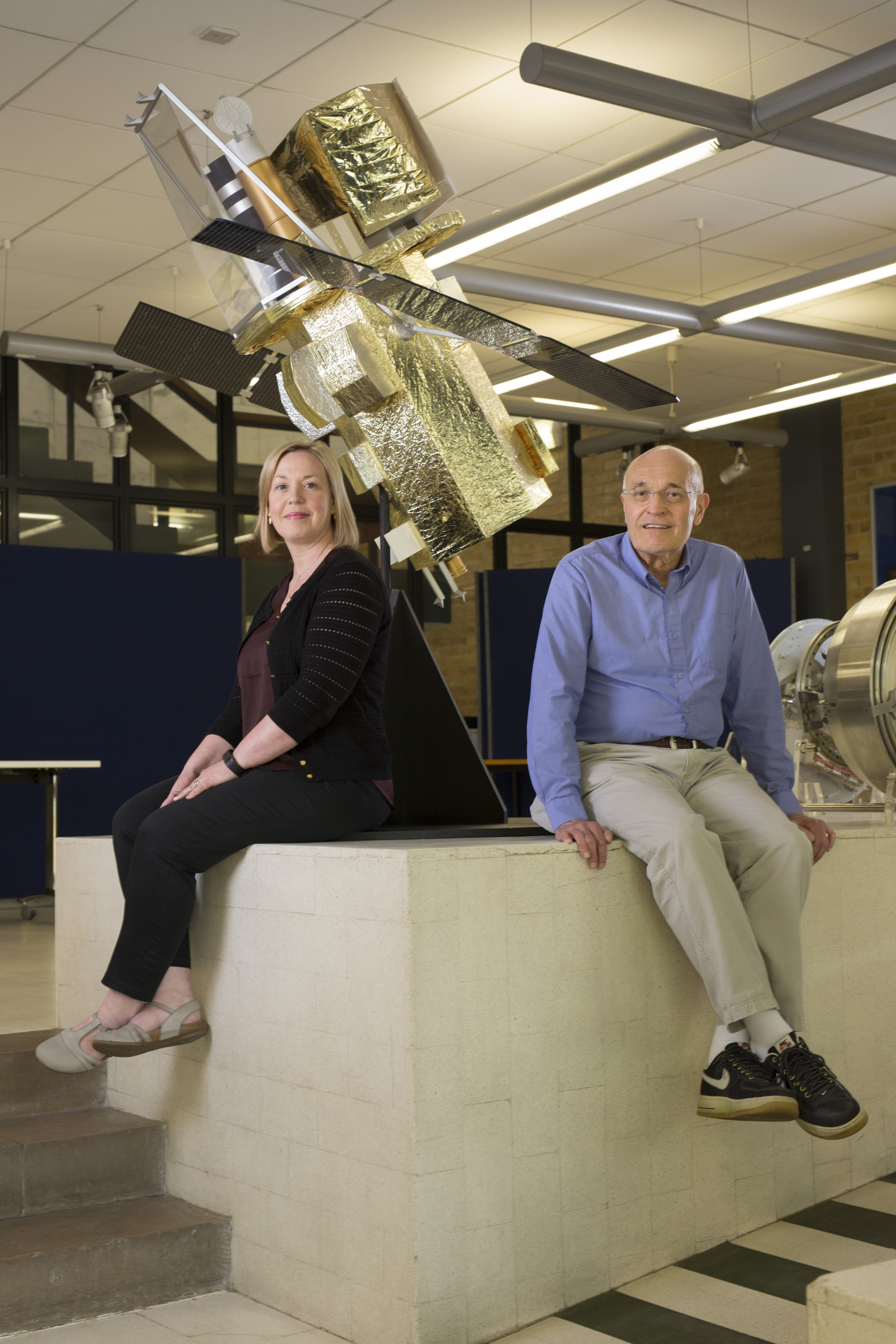
Emma Bunce and Stan Cowley in 2006
