= Magnetopause =

Abrupt boundary between a magnetosphere and the surrounding plasma

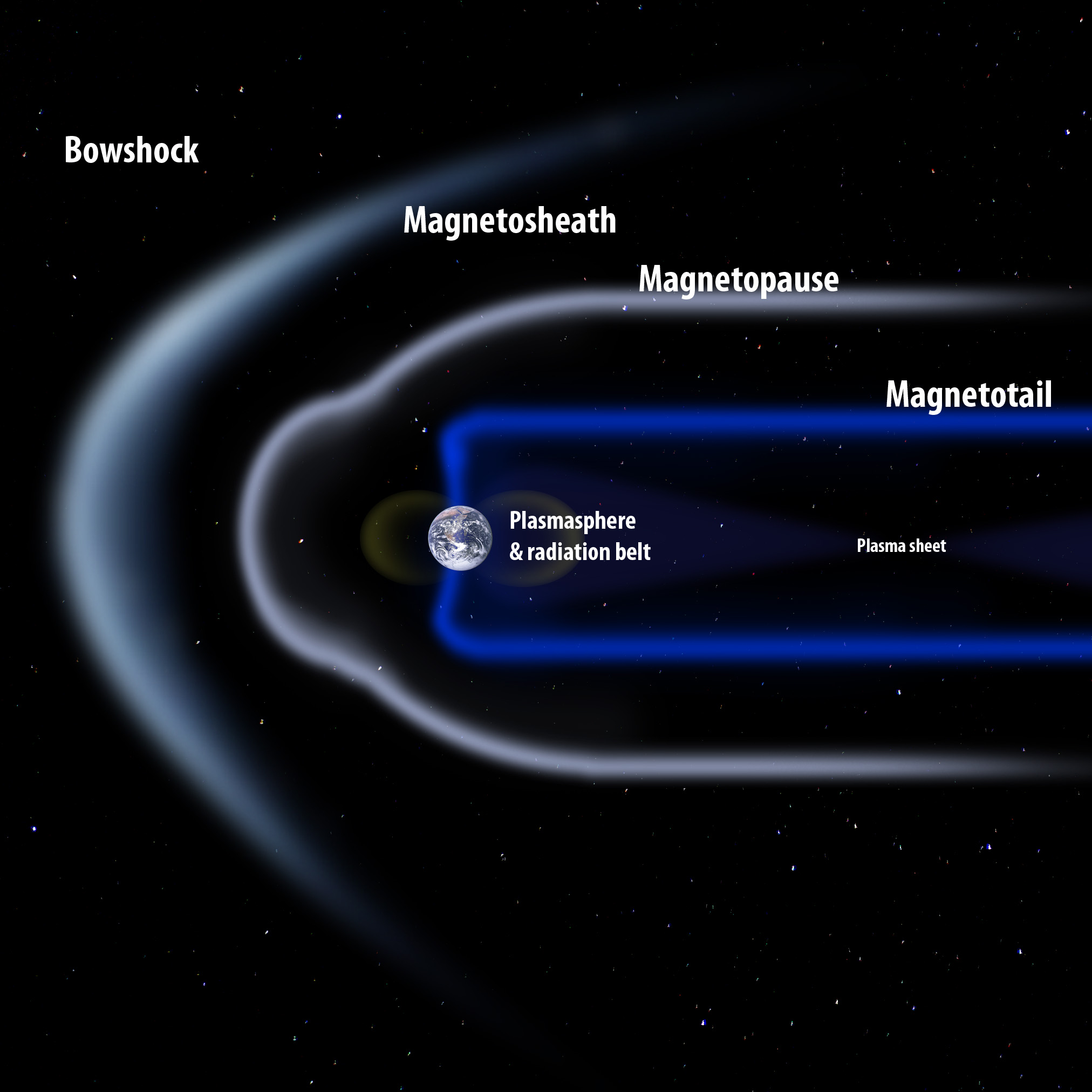
Artistic rendition of the Earth's magnetopause. The magnetopause is where the pressure from the solar wind and the planet's magnetic field are equal. The position of the Sun would be far to the left in this image.

The magnetopause is the abrupt boundary between a magnetosphere and the surrounding plasma. For planetary science, the magnetopause is the boundary between the planet's magnetic field and the solar wind. The location of the magnetopause is determined by the balance between the pressure of the dynamic planetary magnetic field and the dynamic pressure of the solar wind. As the solar wind pressure increases and decreases, the magnetopause moves inward and outward in response. Waves (ripples and flapping motion) along the magnetopause move in the direction of the solar wind flow in response to small-scale variations in the solar wind pressure and to Kelvin–Helmholtz instabilities.

The solar wind is supersonic and passes through a bow shock where the direction of flow is changed so that most of the solar wind plasma is deflected to either side of the magnetopause, much like water is deflected before the bow of a ship. The zone of shocked solar wind plasma is the magnetosheath. At Earth and all the other planets with intrinsic magnetic fields, some solar wind plasma succeeds in entering and becoming trapped within the magnetosphere. At Earth, the solar wind plasma which enters the magnetosphere forms the plasma sheet. The amount of solar wind plasma and energy that enters the magnetosphere is regulated by the orientation of the interplanetary magnetic field, which is embedded in the solar wind.

The Sun and other stars with magnetic fields and stellar winds have a solar magnetopause or heliopause where the stellar environment is bounded by the interstellar environment.

== Characteristics ==
Schematic representation of a planetary dipole magnetic field in a vacuum (right side) deformed by a region of plasma with infinite conductivity. The Sun is to the left. The configuration is equivalent to an image dipole (green arrow) being placed at twice the distance from the planetary dipole to the interaction boundary.

Prior to the age of space exploration, interplanetary space was considered to be a vacuum. The coincidence of the first observation of a solar flare and the geomagnetic storm of 1859 was evidence that plasma was ejected from the Sun during the flare event. Chapman and Ferraro proposed that a plasma was emitted by the Sun in a burst as part of a flare event which disturbed the planet's magnetic field in a manner known as a geomagnetic storm. The collision frequency of particles in the plasma in the interplanetary medium is very low and the electrical conductivity is so high that it could be approximated to an infinite conductor.

A magnetic field in a vacuum cannot penetrate a volume with infinite conductivity. Chapman and Bartels (1940) illustrated this concept by postulating a plate with infinite conductivity placed on the dayside of a planet's dipole as shown in the schematic. The field lines on the dayside are bent. At low latitudes, the magnetic field lines are pushed inward. At high latitudes, the magnetic field lines are pushed backwards and over the polar regions. The boundary between the region dominated by the planet's magnetic field (i.e., the magnetosphere) and the plasma in the interplanetary medium is the magnetopause. The configuration equivalent to a flat, infinitely conductive plate is achieved by placing an image dipole (green arrow at left of schematic) at twice the distance from the planet's dipole to the magnetopause along the planet-Sun line. Since the solar wind is continuously flowing outward, the magnetopause above, below and to the sides of the planet are swept backward into the geomagnetic tail as shown in the artist's concept. The region (shown in pink in the schematic) which separates field lines from the planet which are pushed inward from those which are pushed backward over the poles is an area of weak magnetic field or day-side cusp. Solar wind particles can enter the planet's magnetosphere through the cusp region. Because the solar wind exists at all times and not just times of solar flares, the magnetopause is a permanent feature of the space near any planet with a magnetic field.

The magnetic field lines of the planet's magnetic field are not stationary. They are continuously joining or merging with magnetic field lines of the interplanetary magnetic field in a process called magnetic reconnection. The joined field lines are swept back over the poles into the planetary magnetic tail. In the tail, the field lines from the planet's magnetic field are re-joined and start moving toward night-side of the planet. The physics of this process was first explained by Dungey (1961). As such, the process is now referred to as the Dungey Cycle.

If one assumed that magnetopause was just a boundary between a magnetic field in a vacuum and a plasma with a weak magnetic field embedded in it, then the magnetopause would be defined by electrons and ions penetrating one gyroradius into the magnetic field domain. Since the gyro-motion of electrons and ions is in opposite directions, an electric current flows along the boundary. The actual magnetopause is much more complex.

== Estimating the standoff distance to the magnetopause ==
If the pressure from particles within the magnetosphere is neglected, it is possible to estimate the distance to the part of the magnetosphere that faces the Sun. The condition governing this position is that the dynamic ram pressure from the solar wind is equal to the magnetic pressure from the Earth's magnetic field: (Note: The reason for the factor of 4 is because the magnetic field strength just inside the magnetopause is twice the dipole value for a planar magnetopause)
$$(\rho v^2)_{sw}\approx \left( \frac{4 B(r)^2}{2\mu_0} \right) _m$$
where $\rho$ and $v$ are the density and velocity of the solar wind, and B(r) is the magnetic field strength of the planet in SI units (B in T, μ_{0} in H/m).

Since the dipole magnetic field strength varies with distance as $1/r^3$ the magnetic field strength can be written as $B(r) = {\mu_0 m \over 4\pi r^3}$, where $m$ is the planet's magnetic moment, expressed in $A \cdot m^2$.
$$\rho v^2 \approx \frac{\mu_0 m^2}{8\pi^2r^6}.$$
Solving this equation for r leads to an estimate of the distance
$$r \approx \sqrt[6]{\frac{\mu_0 m^2}{8\pi^2 \rho v^2}}$$

The distance from Earth to the subsolar magnetopause varies over time due to solar activity, but typical distances range from 6–15 R$_{\oplus}$. Empirical models using real-time solar wind data can provide a real-time estimate of the magnetopause location. A bow shock stands upstream from the magnetopause. It serves to decelerate and deflect the solar wind flow before it reaches the magnetopause.

== Solar System magnetopauses ==
Overview of the Solar System magnetopauses
Planet	Number	Magnetic moment (Note: compared to Earth's magnetic moment (7.906 × 10^{31} gauss m^{3}))	Magnetopause distance (Note: typical distance between magnetopause and magnetosphere in planet radii)	Observed size of the magnetosphere (Note: in planet radii)	variance of magnetosphere (Note: in planet radii, the magnetosphere varies mainly in response to solar wind dynamic pressure and interplanetary magnetic field orientation)
Mercury	1	0.0004	1.5	1.4	0
Venus	2	0	0	0	0
Earth	3	1	10	10	2
Mars	4	0	0	0	0
Jupiter	5	20000	42	75	25
Saturn	6	600	19	19	3
Uranus	7	50	25	18	0
Neptune	8	25	24	24.5	1.5

Research on the magnetopause is often conducted using the LMN coordinate system (which is set of axes like XYZ). N points normal to the magnetopause outward to the magnetosheath, L lies along the projection of the dipole axis onto the magnetopause (positive northward), and M completes the triad by pointing dawnward.

Venus and Mars do not have a planetary magnetic field and do not have a magnetopause. The solar wind interacts with the planet's atmosphere and a void is created behind the planet. In the case of the Earth's moon and other bodies without a magnetic field or atmosphere, the body's surface interacts with the solar wind and a void is created behind the body.

== See also ==
- Heliopause
- Geopause
- Bow shock
- Solar System
- For applications to spacecraft propulsion, see magnetic sail
