= Alan Hood =

Scottish academic and astronomer

Alan William Hood is a professor in the Solar and Magnetospheric Theory Group at the University of St Andrews in Scotland.

He is best known for his wave heating theory involving the Coronal heating problem of the Sun's atmosphere.

He is married to Beatrice Hood, a part-time primary school teacher at St Leonard's School, St Andrews, with whom he has three children: Rachel born 1983, Alistair born 1985 and Graeme born 1987.
