= Eugene Parker =

American solar physicist (1927–2022)

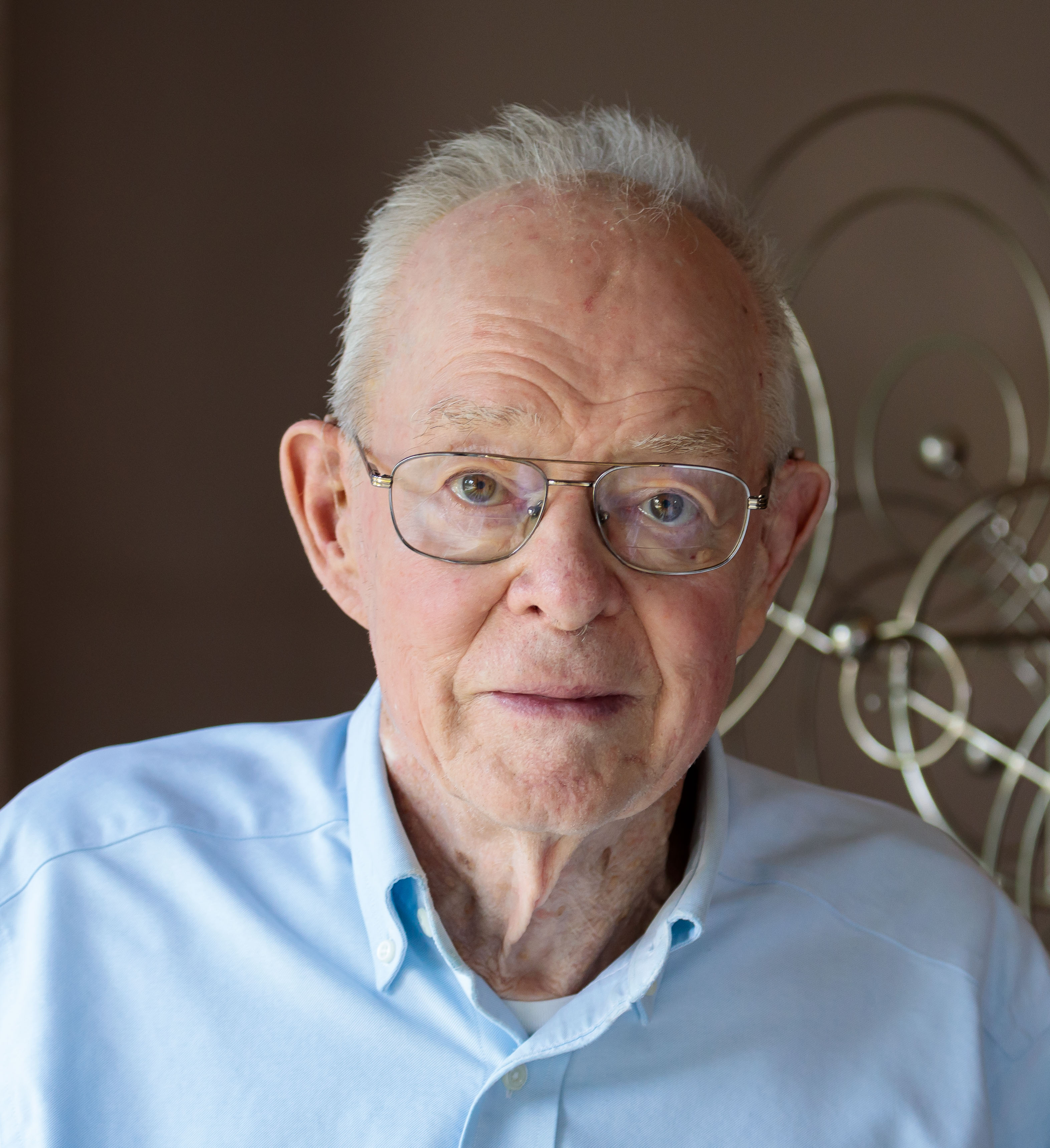
- Parker in 2019
- Born: Eugene Newman Parker; June 10, 1927; Houghton, Michigan, U.S.
- Died: March 15, 2022 (aged 94); Chicago, Illinois, U.S.
- Education: Michigan State University (BS); Caltech (PhD)
- Known for: Solar wind Sweet–Parker model Parker spiral Parker theorem Parker equation Parker instability
- Awards: See #Awards and honors
- Scientific career
- Fields: Solar physics, heliophysics, plasma physics
- Workplaces: University of Chicago
- Thesis: The interstellar dust and gas structures (1951)
- Doctoral advisor: Howard P. Robertson, Leverett Davis
- Doctoral students: Arnab Rai Choudhuri

Eugene Newman Parker (June 10, 1927 – March 15, 2022) was an American solar and plasma physicist, often called the "father" and "founder" of heliophysics. In 1958, he proposed the existence of the solar wind and predicted that the magnetic field in the outer Solar System would be in the shape of a Parker spiral—predictions initially rejected by reviewers and scientific community, but quickly confirmed by the Mariner 2 spacecraft in 1962. Multiple phenomena in solar and plasma physics bear his name, including the Parker instability, Parker equation, Sweet–Parker model of magnetic reconnection, Parker limit on magnetic monopoles, and Parker theorem. In 1988, he proposed that nanoflares could explain the coronal heating problem, a theory that remains a leading candidate.

Parker obtained his PhD from Caltech in 1951 and spent four years at the University of Utah before joining the University of Chicago in 1955, where he spent the rest of his career at the Enrico Fermi Institute. He wrote more than 400 papers, mostly without co-authors, and received multiple awards including the National Medal of Science (1989), Gold Medal of the Royal Astronomical Society (1992), Kyoto Prize (2003), and Crafoord Prize (2020). In 2017, NASA renamed its Solar Probe Plus mission to Parker Solar Probe in his honor, the first NASA spacecraft named after a living person.

== Biography ==
Eugene Newman Parker was born in Houghton, Michigan to Glenn and Helen (née MacNair) Parker on June 10, 1927. Parker's grandfather was a president of the Michigan College of Mines in Houghton and a physicist. Parker's uncle was also a physicist, who worked at Bell Laboratories.

Eugene had two younger siblings, a brother and a sister. His father, Glenn, a mining surveyor and then an engineer, worked at Consolidated Aircraft company. When Eugene was seven, the family moved to Detroit, for his father's graduate studies in engineering, and later his work for Chrysler. His mother, Helen, got a mathematics degree at Stanford, but did not pursue a career. By the time Eugene went to university, his parents moved from Detroit to a farm in Arkansas.

Parker became interested in science and engineering from childhood: he was interested in steam trains, and found the mechanical principles of it to be "fascinating". At six, he got his deceased grandfather's 50-power microscope. He became interested in math when it went beyond arithmetics in school, and then in physics.

During World War II, Parker, then 16, bought a "tax-delinquent property": 40-acre area in the woods of Cheboygan County, around 300 miles from Detroit, for $120 he earned earlier in summer. Together with his brother and cousin, Parker spent three summers building a log cabin there, going by bicycle as there were no other ways to commute. The log cabin with no electricity and running water was in use by Parker's family for almost 80 years.

Parker received his Bachelor of Science degree in physics from Michigan State University in 1948 and a Doctor of Philosophy (PhD) degree from Caltech in 1951. He had a tuition scholarship at Michigan, but not at Caltech. To earn money for the first semester, he worked as a technician at the Physics Laboratory at Chrysler Engineering for six months in 1948. Parker later wrote that William Smythe's year-long course in electricity and magnetism was the most demanding course in his first year at Caltech, but noted that after several weeks the problems became easier and he "aced" the exam. Parker later got a teaching assistantship with the help of William A. Fowler. Parker worked with Howard P. Robertson, who suggested him to study dynamics of the interstellar medium. When Robertson left Caltech, Parker continued to work with Leverett Davis, who became his PhD advisor.

Parker's PhD thesis was of two parts: a dynamical analysis of interstellar gas clouds and a study of dust structures in the Pleiades. In the first, gas clouds were idealized as self-gravitating Hamiltonian systems, leading to the result that they either disperse to infinity or collapse into compact objects such as stars, a result accepted for publication without controversy; Parker later called the idea "a dubious assumption". The second part proposed that "the long thin curved dust striations observed in the Pleiades" require an interstellar magnetic field of at least a microgauss to prevent dust grains, driven by interstellar winds, from smearing out into diffuse clouds. Because the grains are photoelectrically charged, they can remain tied to magnetic field lines, preserving the observed narrow striations.

After Caltech, Parker got a job as an instructor at the Department of Mathematics at the University of Utah. After two years there, he found out that he would not be offered a permanent position and that he would be fired soon. After a talk with Walter Elsasser he was proposed "a position as a one-third time assistant professor in the Physics Department and a two-thirds time research associate with him". He worked with Elsasser for two years. In 1955, John Simpson invited Parker to the University of Chicago as a theoretician to study cosmic rays; Parker spent the rest of his career there, at the Enrico Fermi Institute. He became full professor in 1962, and served as a head of the physics department in 1970–1972, and of the department of astronomy and astrophysics in 1972–1978. Parker retired in 1995, but continued to work and publish papers. Parker had 14 PhD students.

== Solar physics research ==
I always looked upon myself as a physicist learning new tricks by looking at nature. Space, the whole galaxy, the whole Universe — I know no better place to find new physics.

— Eugene Parker

Parker is often called the "father", "unquestioned founder", and a "legendary figure" in heliophysics. Astrophysicist Angela Olinto noted that "Gene's name is quite literally written in our star", referencing multiple phenomena discovered by Parker: "the Parker instability, which describes magnetic fields in galaxies; the Parker equation, which describes particles moving through plasmas; the Sweet-Parker model of magnetic fields in plasmas; and the Parker limit on the flux of magnetic monopoles."

Parker wrote more than 400 papers and four books. Most of his papers are single authored; Parker never wrote papers with his students, "urging them to be independent". Parker never co-authored a paper if he did not reproduce all calculations, and he never used computers for research. Parker's research relied on classical physics like Maxwell's equations and magnetohydrodynamics, he did not use methods from quantum mechanics or the theory of relativity.

Astrophysicist Arnab Rai Choudhuri, Parker's PhD student, wrote that "it is impossible for one person to fully understand the significance of all of Parker's works at a technical level, unless that person also happens to be almost as brilliant as Parker himself!"

Choudhuri described Parker as a very independent researcher:

Parker's papers are always marvels of scientific composition and bear the stamp of a scientific autocrat who enjoyed doing science in his own terms. He would always pay particular attention to the logical structure of the paper. Since Parker often dealt with complex ideas years before others paid attention to them, it may not always be easy to read his papers. But a reader with the prerequisite technical knowledge can always follow the clear thread of scientific logic. Nothing would be fuzzy or obscure.

=== 1955: Turbulent dynamo theory ===
Confronting Cowling's antidynamo theorem, Parker showed that in a rotating, convecting conductor, turbulence becomes helical, enabling large-scale field growth when averaged ("mean-field" theory). He wrote down a tractable dynamo equation and identified wave-like solutions (dynamo waves) that offered a physical picture for the sunspot belt's equatorward drift across a cycle. Parker's paper established the feasibility of MHD dynamos, showed turbulence can build global order, and sketched a solar-cycle model. (Note: See Parker 1955a and Parker 1993.)

=== 1955: Magnetic buoyancy and bipolar sunspots ===
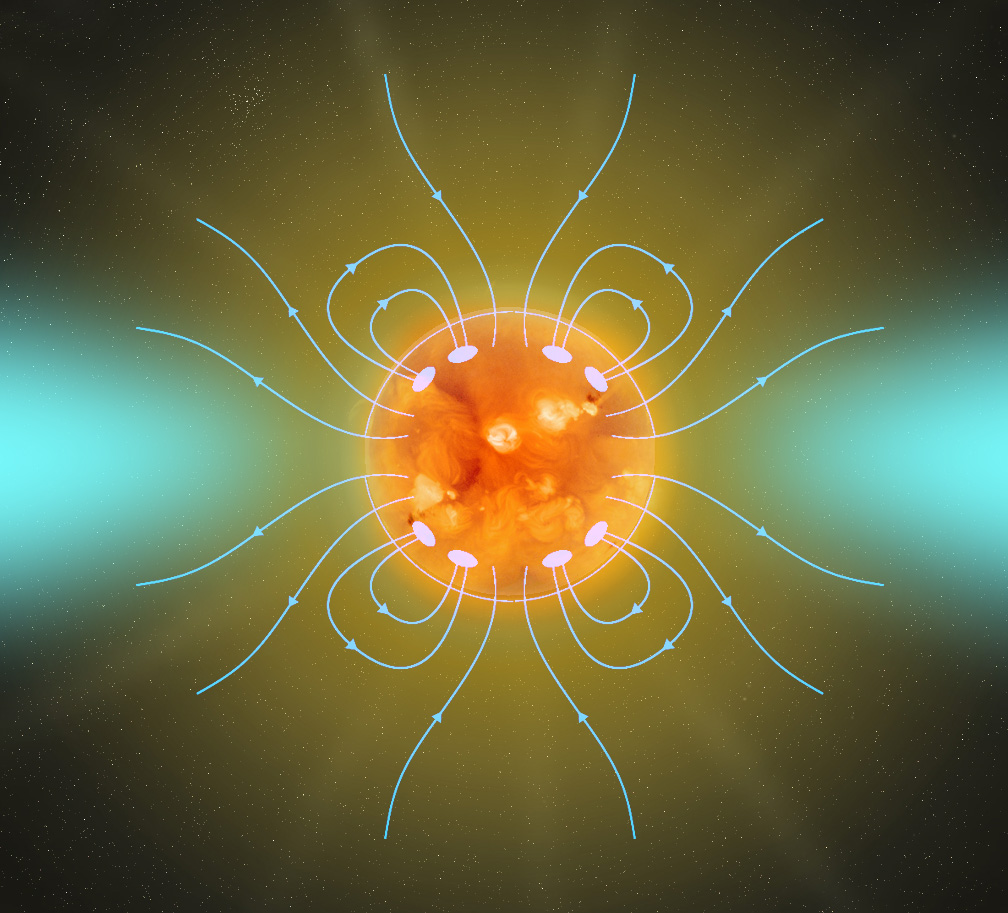
Solar magnetic field lines

Parker explained how strong toroidal flux generated in the solar interior becomes lighter than its surroundings due to magnetic pressure, making segments buoyant and able to rise to the surface as Ω-shaped loops that produce bipolar sunspot pairs. He later showed that buoyancy is enhanced in the convection zone but suppressed just below, naturally "anchoring" loop footpoints—consistent with the observed morphology. This framework led to thin-flux-tube and full-MHD simulations and clarified links to Joy's law tilts and toroidal field strengths at depth. (Note: See Parker 1955b, Parker 1975, and Parker 1979a.)

=== 1957: Magnetic reconnection (Sweet–Parker model) ===
Building on Sweet's neutral-sheet model, Parker derived the canonical inflow rate for resistive reconnection in a long, thin current sheet—now called Sweet–Parker scaling. Historical publication delays meant Parker's paper appeared first but credited Sweet's mechanism. While crucial, the Sweet–Parker rate is too slow for flare rise times, motivating later fast-reconnection scenarios and modern numerical/kinetic work. The classical rate remains a baseline against which faster mechanisms are compared. (Note: See Parker 1957.)

=== 1958: Solar wind and the Parker spiral ===
Artist's impression of solar wind flow around Earth's magnetosphere

Solar wind observed by the Parker Solar Probe, 2018

In the 19th and early 20th century the prevailing view was that the Sun is a static object, connected to planets and minor bodies only via gravity. The first evidence of a constant particle flow was found in comets, whose tails always point away from the Sun. In 1950s, the German astrophysicist Ludwig Franz Biermann studied how comet tails interact with the Sun. Biermann stated that "solar corpuscular radiation" was needed to explain the observed behavior. In 1956, he came to the University of Chicago, where he discussed his results with Parker. Parker also discussed the solar corona with mathematician Sydney Chapman, who mentioned that "the corona is so hot that it should extend clear to the orbit of the Earth". Parker then conjectured that "the corona and solar corpuscular radiation must be the same thing":

I called it the solar wind because I felt that solar corpuscular radiation gives the wrong idea. With that term, one thinks of individual particles being shot out, which was the original picture we had. But it really is an ordinary flow of gas.

The math needed to discover the solar wind was, per Parker just "four lines of algebra". When he wrote hydrodynamic equations for an isothermal, extended coronal atmosphere, the plasma flow velocity integrated to a closed form:
$$\left[\frac{v^2}{v_m^2} - \ln\left(\frac{v^2}{v_m^2}\right)\right] = 4\ln\left(\frac{r}{a}\right) + \left(\frac{v_{\text{esc}}^2}{v_m^2}\right)\left(\frac{a}{r}\right) - 4\ln\left(\frac{v_{\text{esc}}^2}{v_m^2}\right) - 3 + \ln 256$$
One solution to this equation was immediately recognizable as a solar wind.

Parker's theory of supersonic solar wind also predicted the shape of the solar magnetic field in the outer Solar System. Parker argued that a million-degree corona cannot remain static: pressure forces must drive a radially expanding flow that accelerates from subsonic near the Sun to supersonic beyond a critical point. He further noted that solar rotation winds outward-advected magnetic field lines into a spiral pattern in the ecliptic, now called the Parker spiral.

His theoretical modeling was not immediately accepted by the astronomical community: when he submitted the results to The Astrophysical Journal in 1958, (Note: See Parker 1958a) two reviewers recommended its rejection. One reviewer commented on the paper: "Well I would suggest that Parker go to the library and read up on the subject before he tries to write a paper about it, because this is utter nonsense." The editor of the journal and Parker's colleague at the University of Chicago, future Nobel prize-winner Subrahmanyan Chandrasekhar, finding no obvious errors in the paper, overruled the reviewers and published the paper, even though he disagreed with Parker's theory. At the time, no spacecraft took measurements of space medium, and Parker himself was an unknown 31-year-old professor from Chicago.

One of the most vocal critics was a colleague at the University of Chicago, Joseph W. Chamberlain, who published a paper in 1960 showing that the plasma flow velocity equation also admitted a solution with an exponential decay in flow velocity away from the sun. Chamberlain's subsonic solution was called the "solar breeze".

Parker wrote to his parents about the solar wind theory rejection:

It is amazing that everyone who has had his formal training in astronomy refuses to accept the idea of a solar wind. They will argue like mad that any child knows that the Sun is a static object. Even when you whip them with a bit of both theory and observations, they won't go along with it. They discount the observations and won't study the theory.

Parker's theoretical predictions were confirmed by satellite observations: in 1959, the flow of particles from the Sun was detected by the Soviet's Luna 2. In 1962, four years after the original publication, Mariner 2 mission carried out observations with a specifically designed instrument. It is called to be "a unique example in astrophysics, due to its immediate and brief confirmation by observations". Mariner 2 data revealed two types of solar wind, a low- and a high-speed components. The paper became Parker's most famous publication. (Note: See also Parker 1958b, Parker 1959, Parker 1963a, Parker 1964 and Parker 1965a.)

=== 1960s: Cosmic-ray transport in the heliosphere and magnetic flux tubes ===
After establishing the solar wind, Parker modeled cosmic-ray propagation as diffusion through wind-borne magnetic irregularities combined with advection by the outflow. He wrote a Fokker–Planck transport equation and estimated anisotropic diffusion coefficients (easier along the mean field than across it).

With Jokipii, he quantified how scattering produces cross-field spread along Parker-spiral lines, consistent with observations, cementing the modern transport framework used in heliophysics and space weather. (Note: See Parker 1965b, Jokipii & Parker 1969b.)

=== 1966: Galactic magnetism: Parker instability and galactic dynamo ===
Parker treated the interstellar gas, magnetic field, and cosmic rays as a coupled system in a galactic disk. He showed that horizontal fields are buoyantly unstable: gas drains downward, magnetized "arches" rise, and dense clumps collect in valleys—an undular mode now called the Parker instability. Nonlinear evolution produces structures reminiscent of observed gas clumping along spiral arms. He also formulated a local αΩ dynamo for spiral galaxies, with helical turbulence and differential rotation amplifying toroidal fields on timescales shorter than galactic ages, aligning with observed large-scale patterns. (Note: See Parker 1966, Parker 1967a, Parker 1967b, Lerche & Parker 1968, Parker 1969a, Parker 1970 and Parker 1971.)

=== 1970: Parker limit on magnetic monopoles ===
Reasoning that abundant monopoles would short out galactic magnetic fields, Parker related monopole density and drift to magnetic-field decay and demanded consistency with field persistence/growth, obtaining a stringent upper bound—the Parker limit. The estimate, first offered in a Russell lecture as a " back-of-the-envelope calculation", later guided experimental monopole searches across particle physics and cosmology. (Note: See Parker 1970.)

=== 1972: Parker theorem ===
The Parker theorem, also known as the fundamental magnetostatic theorem, was formulated in 1972. It describes how magnetic fields behave in perfectly conducting fluids, particularly in space plasmas. The theorem states that three-dimensional magnetic fields naturally form infinitesimally thin current sheets – regions where the magnetic field direction changes abruptly. These sheets arise from the fundamental interaction between magnetic fields that are "frozen" into the conducting fluid. (Note: See Parker 1972.)

=== 1972–1988: Coronal heating and nanoflares ===
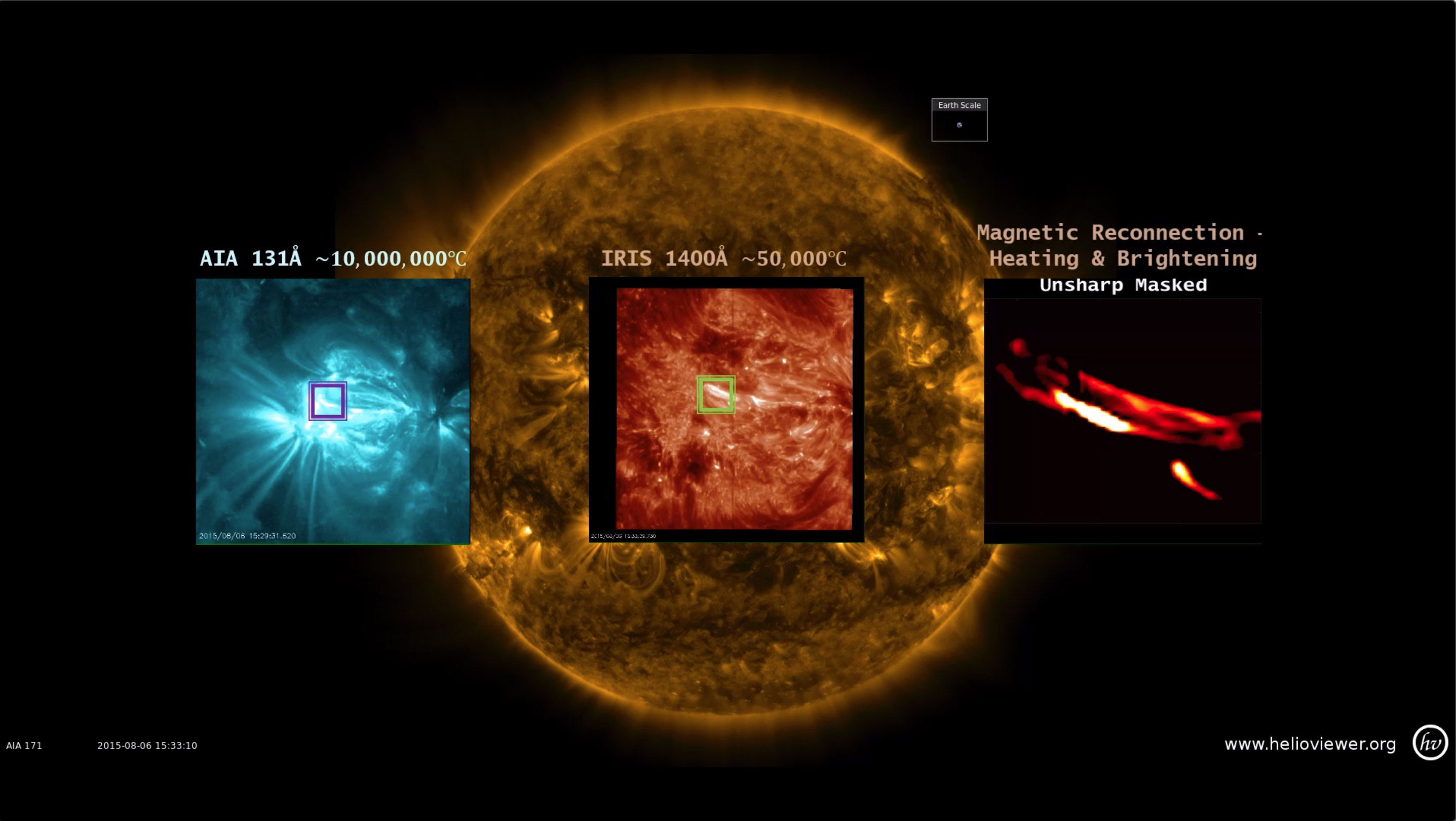
A close-up of one of the loop brightenings. The frame on the far right is the most zoomed in, showing the putative nanoflare.

Parker argued that random footpoint motions in the photosphere inevitably tangle coronal fields, making smooth equilibria topologically unattainable. The corona relaxes via ubiquitous current sheets where reconnection dissipates energy, supplying heat. Initial skepticism gave way to broader interest as stellar coronal X-rays were established; Parker then estimated the energy budget and introduced the nanoflare concept—many small events rather than single large releases. The field converged on a mixed picture: closed-loop regions likely dominated by current-sheet heating; open-field regions more wave-driven.

Seeking to address the coronal heating problem, in 1988 Parker proposed that the solar corona might be heated by myriad tiny "nanoflares", miniature brightenings resembling solar flares that would occur all over the surface of the Sun. Parker's theory became a leading candidate to explain the problem. (Note: See Parker 1972, Parker 1983, Parker 1988, Parker 1989, and Parker 1994.)

== Parker Solar Probe ==
In 1960, a Space Science Board report recommended a solar spacecraft mission to study the origins of solar wind, and another mission to the outer Solar System "to study the interaction of the heliosphere with the interstellar medium". In 2010, NASA approved the Solar Probe Plus mission; Parker was invited as an advisor.

In 2017, NASA renamed the Solar Probe Plus to Parker Solar Probe in Parker's honor, the first NASA spacecraft named after a living person. The name was proposed by Thomas Zurbuchen, then the head of science at NASA, who described PSP's mission as "a trip to hell and back" and "one of the most difficult and historic missions NASA has ever done". In October 2017, Parker visited the spacecraft at the Johns Hopkins Applied Physics Laboratory in Laurel, Maryland. In 2018, Parker and his family traveled to Cape Canaveral to watch the PSP's launch.

PSP's science teams sent preprints and publications to Parker, who was excited about the mission.

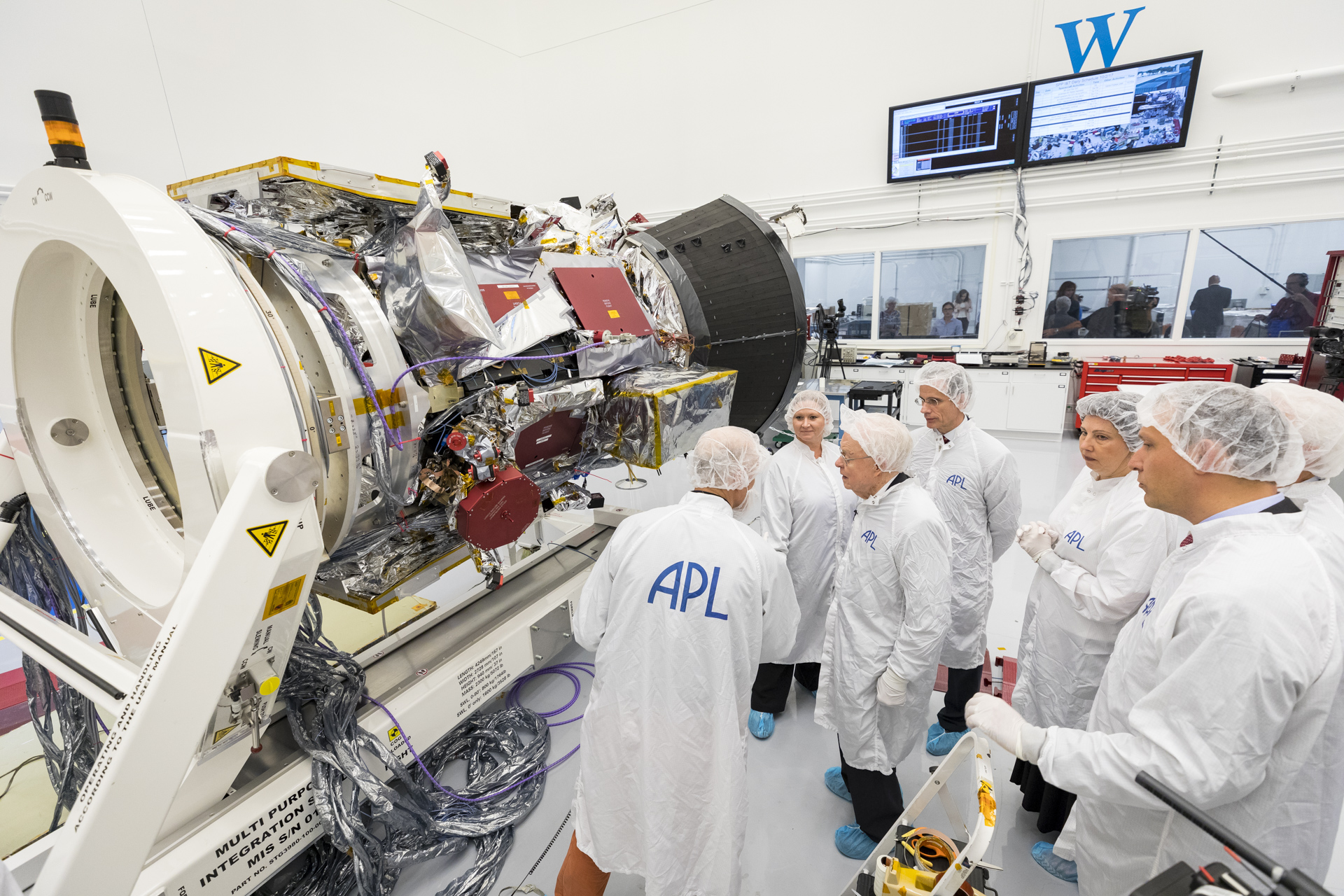
Parker visits the spacecraft at APL

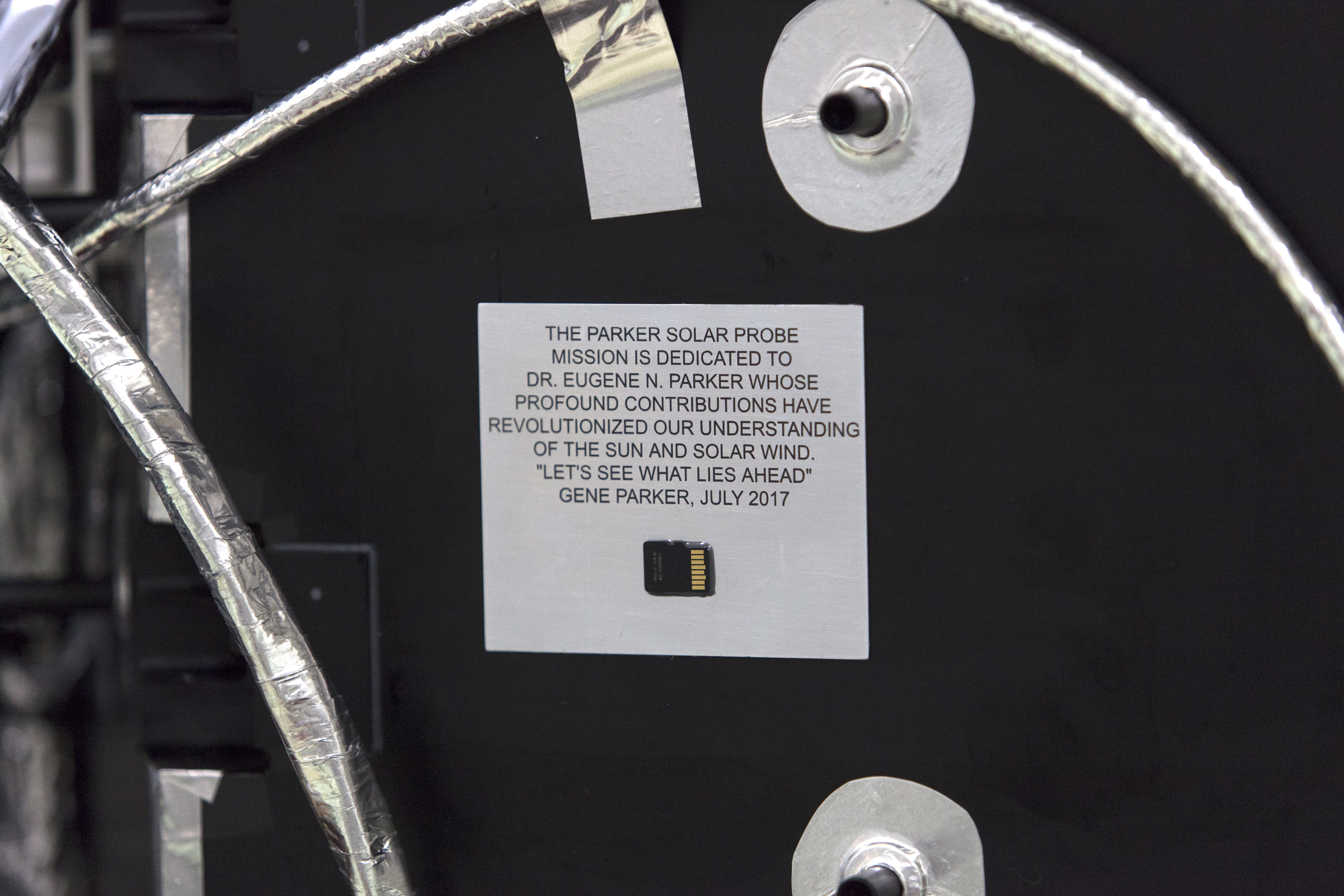
A plaque with a dedication to Eugene Parker mounted to the PSP

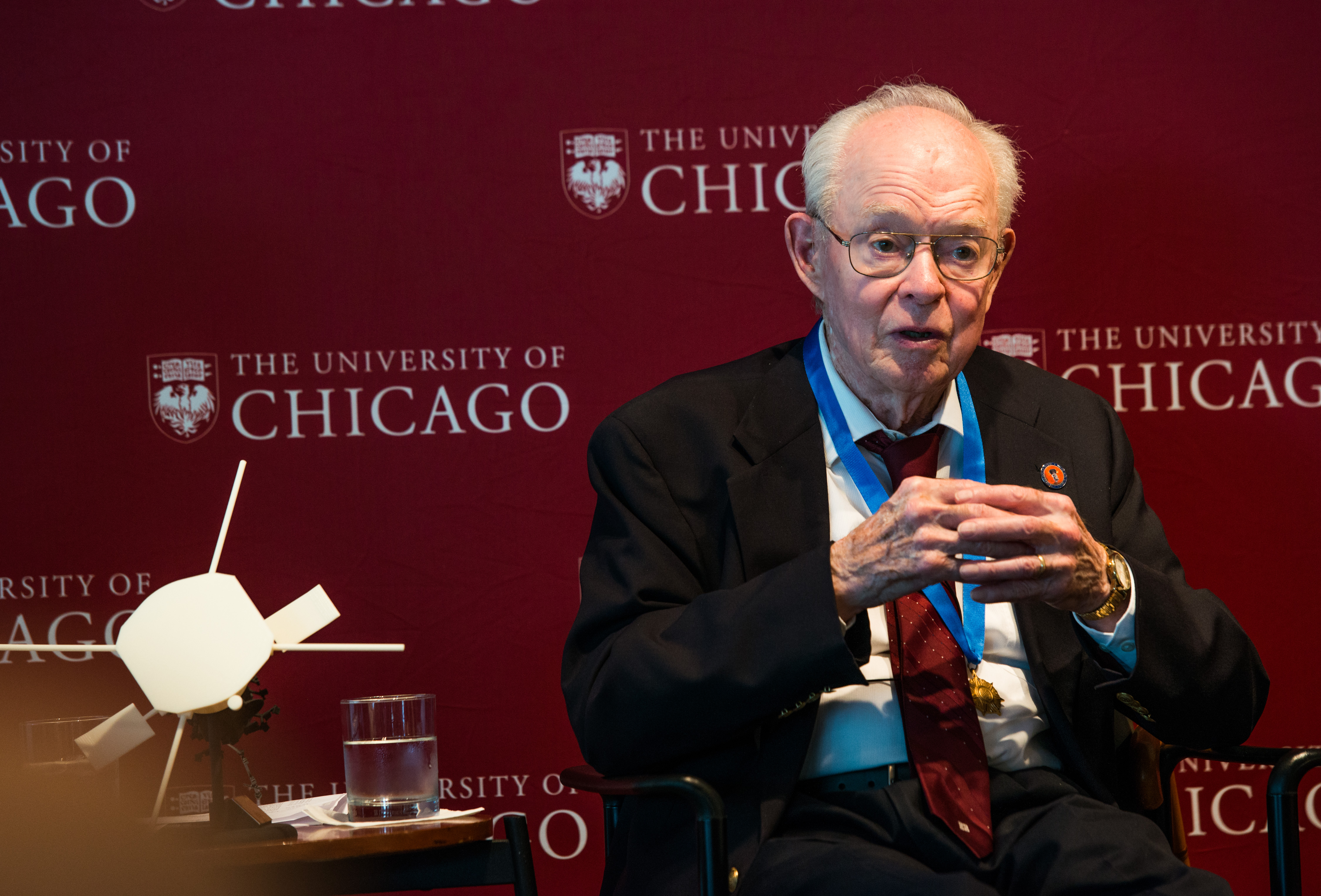
Parker with a model of the PSP

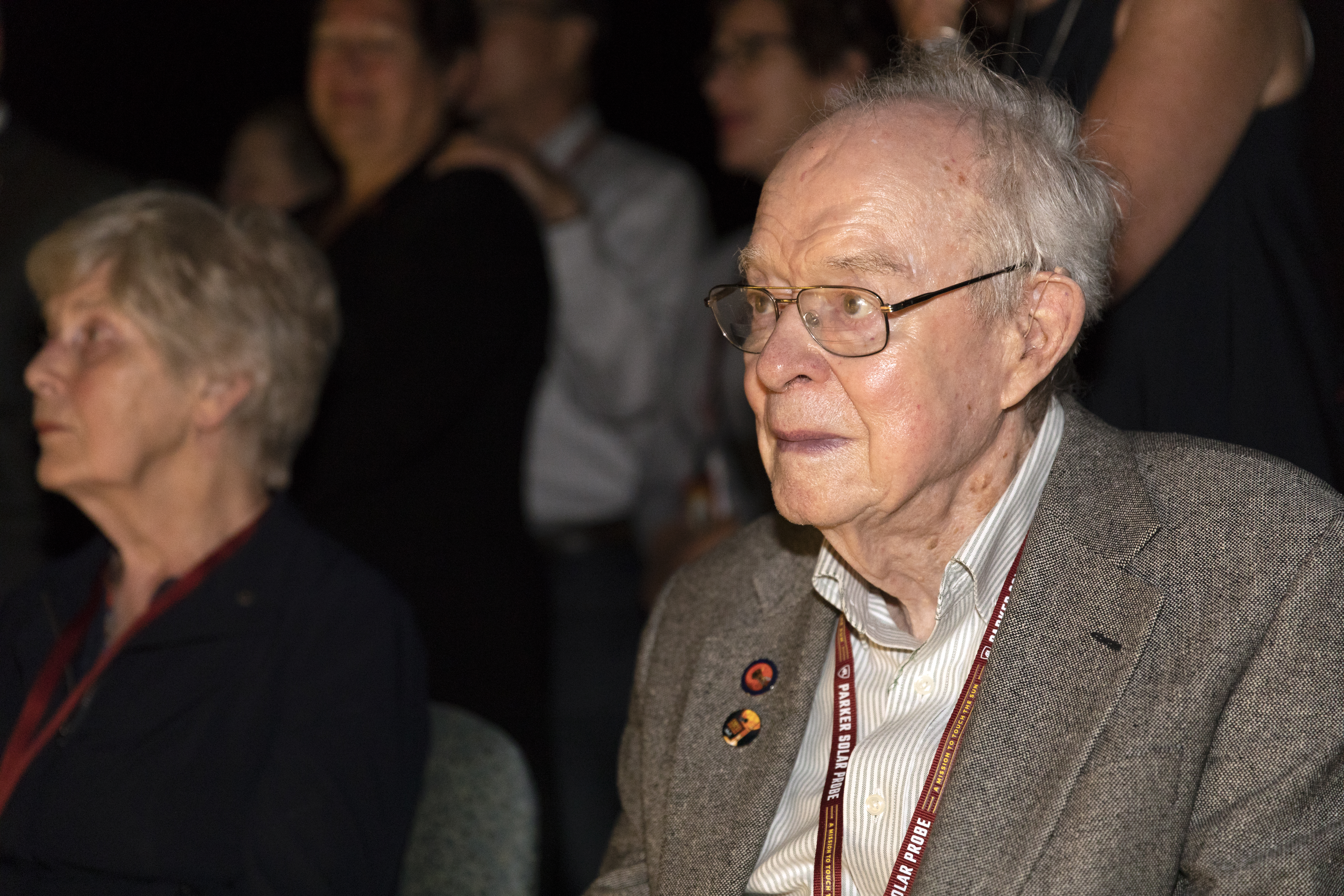
Parker at the PSP's launch

In a National Geographic article, "Dear Parker Solar Probe", Parker wrote:

Dear Solar Probe:

I think there's a point that's not widely appreciated, but it's fundamental: The Sun is an ordinary star of middling mass and middling brightness, but it's a model for almost all stars—and the only one we're going to see up close enough to do a whole lot of measurements. There are stars that are oddballs, the ones that interest the astrophysics types. But the fact that the sun supports life on one of its planets is already a unique designation.

I'm in love with the sun for that reason. Somehow, in many circles, solar physics is looked upon as old, dusty, dried-up problems that don't really have new solutions. On the contrary, it's the one star where we know what we're talking about!

Parker Solar Probe used repeated gravity assists from Venus to develop an eccentric orbit, approaching within 9.86 solar radii (6.9 million km or 4.3 million miles) from the center of the Sun. At its closest approach in 2024, its speed relative to the Sun was 690,000 km/h (430,000 mph) or 191 km/s (118.7 mi/s), which is 0.064% the speed of light. It is the fastest object ever built on Earth. PSP is the first spacecraft that entered the solar atmosphere, which was described by NASA as "touching the Sun". It was done when PSP passed the Alfven surface which marks the end of the solar atmosphere and beginning of the solar wind.

== Personal life ==
Parker met his future wife, Niesje, in Utah. Her family was from the Netherlands; she emigrated to the US after World War II. She had a degree in bacteriology. They married in 1954. In Chicago, Niesje got a job at the University of Chicago Graduate School of Business, and later became an Associate Director of Computing Services. The Parkers were married for 67 years and had two children, a son and a daughter. Parker's hobbies included woodworking, sailing and hiking; at 76, he went to the North Pole with his son.

Parker was described as a humble man with a "genial personality". He never drank alcohol or coffee, "always drove at 55 miles per hour", never sought attention, and was rarely critical of other scientists' works. The only scientist he was openly critical of was Hannes Alfvén, who later was awarded the Nobel Prize in Physics: "Parker did not think the man dug deeply enough into problems and sometimes had been quite wrong". Parker published several papers "challenging and even undercutting Alfven's conclusions".

Parker died in Chicago on March 15, 2022, at the age of 94. His body was cremated, and half of the ashes buried near his log cabin in the woods.

== Awards and honors ==
- 1967: elected to the National Academy of Sciences
- 1969: Arctowski Medal of the National Academy of Sciences
- 1969: Henry Norris Russell Lectureship of the American Astronomical Society
- 1978: George Ellery Hale Prize, Solar Physics Division of the American Astronomical Society, first time this prize was awarded
- 1979: Chapman Medal of the Royal Astronomical Society
- 1989: National Medal of Science
- 1990: William Bowie Medal
- 1992: Gold Medal of the Royal Astronomical Society
- 1997: Bruce Medal
- 2003: Kyoto Prize
- 2003: James Clerk Maxwell Prize of the American Physical Society "For seminal contributions in plasma astrophysics, including predicting the solar wind, explaining the solar dynamo, formulating the theory of magnetic reconnection, and the instability which predicts the escape of the magnetic fields from the galaxy."
- 2010: Member of the Norwegian Academy of Science and Letters.
- 2017: NASA renamed its Solar Probe Plus mission to Parker Solar Probe, the first time that a spacecraft was named after a living person.
- 2018: Medal for Exceptional Achievement in Research of the American Physical Society "For fundamental contributions to space physics, plasma physics, solar physics and astrophysics for over 60 years."
- 2020: Crafoord Prize in Astronomy

== Selected publications ==
Scientific articles

- Parker, Eugene N. (1955a). "Hydromagnetic Dynamo Models". The Astrophysical Journal. 122: 293–314. Bibcode:1955ApJ...122..293P. doi:10.1086/146087.
- Parker, Eugene N. (1955b). "The Formation of Sunspots from the Solar Toroidal Field". The Astrophysical Journal. 121: 491. Bibcode:1955ApJ...121..491P. doi:10.1086/146010.
- Parker, Eugene N. (1957). "Sweet's Mechanism for Merging Magnetic Fields in Conducting Fluids". Journal of Geophysical Research. 62 (4): 509–520. Bibcode:1957JGR....62..509P. doi:10.1029/JZ062i004p00509.
- Parker, Eugene N. (1958a). "Dynamics of the Interplanetary Gas and Magnetic Fields". The Astrophysical Journal. 128: 664. Bibcode:1958ApJ...128..664P. doi:10.1086/146579.
- Parker, Eugene N. (1958b). "Suprathermal Particle Generation in the Solar Corona". Astrophysical Journal. 128: 677. Bibcode:1958ApJ...128..677P. doi:10.1086/146580.
- Parker, Eugene N. (1959). "Extension of the Solar Corona into Interplanetary Space". Journal of Geophysical Research. 64 (11): 1675–1681. Bibcode:1959JGR....64.1675P. doi:10.1029/JZ064i011p01675.
- Parker, Eugene N. (1963a). "Kinematical Hydromagnetic Theory and its Application to the Low Solar Photosphere". The Astrophysical Journal. 138: 552. Bibcode:1963ApJ...138..552P. doi:10.1086/147663.
- Parker, Eugene N. (1964). "The Solar Wind". Scientific American. 210 (4): 66–76. Bibcode:1964SciAm.210d..66P. doi:10.1038/scientificamerican0464-66.
- Parker, Eugene N. (1965a). "Dynamical Theory of the Solar Wind". Space Science Reviews. 4 (5–6): 666–708. Bibcode:1965SSRv....4..666P. doi:10.1007/BF00216273. hdl:2060/19650020962.
- Parker, Eugene N. (1965b). "The Passage of Energetic Charged Particles through Interplanetary Space". Planetary and Space Science. 13 (1): 9–49. Bibcode:1965P&SS...13....9P. doi:10.1016/0032-0633(65)90131-5.
- Parker, Eugene N. (1966). "The Dynamical State of the Interstellar Gas and Field". The Astrophysical Journal. 145: 811. Bibcode:1966ApJ...145..811P. doi:10.1086/148828.
- Parker, Eugene N. (1967a). "The dynamical state of the interstellar gas and field. II. Non-linear growth of clouds and forces in three dimensions". Astrophysical Journal. 149: 517. Bibcode:1967ApJ...149..517P. doi:10.1086/149282.
- Parker, Eugene N. (1967b). "The Dynamical State of the Interstellar Gas and Field. III. Turbulence and Enhanced Diffusion". Astrophysical Journal. 149: 535. Bibcode:1967ApJ...149..535P. doi:10.1086/149283.
- Lerche, I.; Parker, Eugene N. (1968). "The Dynamical State of the Interstellar Gas and Field. VI. Instability and Enhanced Diffusion in a Twisted Field". Astrophysical Journal. 154: 515. Bibcode:1968ApJ...154..515L. doi:10.1086/149778.
- Parker, Eugene N. (1969a). "Galactic effects of the cosmic-ray gas". Space Science Reviews. 9 (5): 651. Bibcode:1969SSRv....9..651P. doi:10.1007/BF00174032.
- Jokipii, J. R.; Parker, E. N. (1969b). "Stochastic Aspects of Magnetic Lines of Force with Application to Cosmic-Ray Propagation". The Astrophysical Journal. 155: 777. Bibcode:1969ApJ...155..777J. doi:10.1086/149909.
- Parker, Eugene N. (1970). "The Origin of Magnetic Fields". The Astrophysical Journal. 160: 383. Bibcode:1970ApJ...160..383P. doi:10.1086/150442.
- Parker, Eugene N. (1971). "The Generation of Magnetic Fields in Astrophysical Bodies. II. The Galactic Field". The Astrophysical Journal. 163: 255. Bibcode:1971ApJ...163..255P. doi:10.1086/150765.
- Parker, Eugene N. (1972). "Topological Dissipation and the Small-Scale Fields in Turbulent Gases". The Astrophysical Journal. 174: 499. Bibcode:1972ApJ...174..499P. doi:10.1086/151512.
- Parker, Eugene N. (1975). "The Generation of Magnetic Fields in Astrophysical Bodies. X - Magnetic Buoyancy and the Solar Dynamo". The Astrophysical Journal. 198: 205–209. Bibcode:1975ApJ...198..205P. doi:10.1086/153593.
- Parker, Eugene N. (1978). "Hydraulic Concentration of Magnetic Fields in the Solar Photosphere. VI. Adiabatic Cooling and Concentration in Downdrafts". The Astrophysical Journal. 221: 368–377. Bibcode:1978ApJ...221..368P. doi:10.1086/156035.
- Parker, Eugene N. (1979a). "Sunspots and the Physics of Magnetic Flux Tubes. I. The General Nature of the Sunspots". The Astrophysical Journal. 230: 905–923. Bibcode:1979ApJ...230..905P. doi:10.1086/157150.
- Parker, Eugene N. (1983). "Magnetic Neutral Sheets in Evolving Fields - Part Two - Formation of the Solar Corona". The Astrophysical Journal. 264: 642. Bibcode:1983ApJ...264..642P. doi:10.1086/160637.
- Parker, Eugene N. (1988). "Nanoflares and the Solar X-Ray Corona". The Astrophysical Journal. 330: 474. Bibcode:1988ApJ...330..474P. doi:10.1086/166485.
- Parker, Eugene N. (1989). "Tangential Discontinuities and the Optical Analogy for Stationary Fields II. The Optical Analogy". Geophysical and Astrophysical Fluid Dynamics. 45 (3): 169–182. Bibcode:1989GApFD..45..169P. doi:10.1080/03091928908208898.
- Parker, Eugene N. (1993). "A Solar Dynamo Surface Wave at the Interface between Convection and Nonuniform Rotation". The Astrophysical Journal. 408: 707. Bibcode:1993ApJ...408..707P. doi:10.1086/172631.
- Parker, Eugene N. (2001). "A history of the solar wind concept". The Century of Space Science. pp. 225–255. doi:10.1007/978-94-010-0320-9_9. ISBN 978-0-7923-7196-0.

Books

- Parker, Eugene N. (1963b). Interplanetary Dynamical Processes. New York: Interscience Publishers. ISBN 978-0-47-065916-8.
- Parker, Eugene N. (1979b). Cosmical Magnetic Fields: Their Origin and Their Activity. Oxford: Clarendon Press. ISBN 978-0-19-851290-5..
- Parker, Eugene N. (1994). Spontaneous Current Sheets in Magnetic Fields: With Applications to Stellar X-rays. Oxford University Press. ISBN 978-0-19-507371-3.
- Parker, Eugene N. (2007). Conversations on Electric and Magnetic Fields in the Cosmos. Princeton University Press. ISBN 978-0-691-12841-2.

Other articles

- Parker, Eugene N. (1996). "S. Chandrasekhar and Magnetohydrodynamics". Journal of Astrophysics and Astronomy. 17 (3–4): 147–166. Bibcode:1996JApA...17..147P. doi:10.1007/BF02702301.
- Parker, E. N. (1997). "The martial art of scientific publication". EOS Transactions. 78 (37): 391–395. Bibcode:1997EOSTr..78..391P. doi:10.1029/97EO00251.
- Parker, Eugene N. (2014). "Reminiscing My Sixty Year Pursuit of the Physics of the Sun and the Galaxy". Research in Astronomy and Astrophysics. 14 (1): 1–14. Bibcode:2014RAA....14....1P. doi:10.1088/1674-4527/14/1/001.
