= Arnab Rai Choudhuri =

Indian scientist

- Born: 9 November 1956 (age 69); Kolkata, West Bengal, India
- Education: Presidency College, Kolkata; University of Calcutta; IIT Kanpur; University of Chicago; High Altitude Observatory
- Known for: Contributions to Solar Dynamo theory
- Scientific career
- Fields: Physics
- Workplaces: Indian Institute of Science, Bangalore
- Thesis: The dynamics of magnetically trapped fluids: implications for umbral dots and penumbtal grains (1985)
- Doctoral advisor: Eugene Parker
- Doctoral students: Mausumi Dikpati, Dibyendu Nandi

Arnab Rai Choudhuri is an Indian astrophysicist and writer known for his contributions to Astrophysical magnetohydrodynamics, specially in context of solar magnetic cycle.

== Biography ==
He obtained his Bachelor of Science in 1978 from Presidency College, University of Calcutta and his Master of Science in physics from the Indian Institute of Technology Kanpur.

He earned his Ph.D. at the University of Chicago in 1985 working under the supervision of Eugene Parker. For then went on to research at the High Altitude Observatory for two years. In 1987, he joined the Physics Department of Indian Institute of Science (IISc) as a lecturer and was appointed as a full professor in 2002.

== Research ==
Choudhuri then went on to work as a visiting scientist at various institutes and observatories around the world, from Isaac Newton Institute, Cambridge to his alma mater University of Chicago.

Choudhuri runs a research group at the Indian Institute of Science which mainly deals with the study of magnetohydrodynamics, focusing on sunspot and solar magnetic cycle modelling. He is a fellow of The World Academy of Sciences and the Indian National Science Academy. In 2022, he was selected as the 9th Laureate of Chandrasekhar Prize of Plasma Physics.

== Selected Publications ==
=== Books ===
Choudhuri has authored the following books:

- Choudhuri, A. R. (1998) The Physics of Fluids and Plasmas: An Introduction for Astrophysicists, Cambridge University Press. ISBN 9781139171069
- Choudhuri, A. R. (2010) Astrophysics for Physicists Cambridge University Press.
- Choudhuri, A. R. (2015) Nature's Third Cycle: A Story of Sunspots Oxford University Press.
