= Stellar atmosphere =

Outer region of the volume of a star

Photo taken in France during the 1999 solar eclipse

The stellar atmosphere is the outer region of the volume of a star, lying above the stellar core, radiation zone and convection zone.

== Overview ==
The stellar atmosphere is divided into several regions of distinct character:

- The photosphere, which is the atmosphere's lowest and coolest layer, is normally its only visible part. Light escaping from the surface of the star stems from this region and passes through the higher layers. The Sun's photosphere has a temperature in the 5,770–5,780 K (5,500–5,510 °C; 9,930–9,940 °F) range. Starspots, cool regions of disrupted magnetic field, lie in the photosphere.
- Above the photosphere lies the chromosphere. This part of the atmosphere first cools down and then starts to heat up to about 10 times the temperature of the photosphere.
- Above the chromosphere lies the transition region, where the temperature increases rapidly on a distance of only around 100 km (62 mi).
- Additionally, many stars have a molecular layer (MOLsphere) above the photosphere and just beyond or even within the chromosphere. The molecular layer is cool enough to contain molecules rather than plasma, and may consist of such components as carbon monoxide, water vapor, silicon monoxide, and titanium oxide.
- The outermost part of the stellar atmosphere, or upper stellar atmosphere, is the corona, a tenuous plasma which has a temperature above one million Kelvin. While all stars on the main sequence feature transition regions and coronae, not all evolved stars do so. It seems that only some giants, and very few supergiants, possess coronae. An unresolved problem in stellar astrophysics is how the corona can be heated to such high temperatures. The answer is believed to lie in magnetic fields, but the exact mechanism remains unclear.
- The astrosphere, which is in the case of the Sun the heliosphere, can be in a broader understanding considered the furthest part of a stellar atmosphere, before interstellar space begins at the heliopause. The astrosphere is not to be confused with the Solar System and its outermost region the Oort cloud, which extends much further than the astrosphere, therefore far into interstellar space.

During a total solar eclipse, the photosphere of the Sun is obscured, revealing its atmosphere's other layers. Observed during eclipse, the Sun's chromosphere appears (briefly) as a thin pinkish arc, and its corona is seen as a tufted halo. The same phenomenon in eclipsing binaries can make the chromosphere of giant stars visible.

== See also ==
- Cecilia Payne-Gaposchkin, who first proposed the presently-accepted composition of stellar atmospheres
- Circumstellar envelope
- Heliosphere
