= Dibyendu Nandi =

Indian space scientist

- Born: Kolkata, West Bengal, India
- Education: St. Xavier's College, Kolkata; University of Calcutta; IISc Bangalore; Montana State University; Center for Astrophysics | Harvard & Smithsonian
- Known for: Contributions to Solar Physics , Space Weather, Exoplanets, Space Science, Magnetohydrodynamics, Nonlinear Dynamics
- Scientific career
- Fields: Physics
- Workplaces: Raman Research Institute, IISER Kolkata
- Doctoral advisor: Arnab Rai Choudhuri
- Doctoral students: Andres Munoz-Jaramillo, Soumitro Hazra, Prantika Bhowmik, Avyarthana Ghosh, Rakesh Mazumdar, Sanchita Pal, Lekshmi B, Athira BS, Suvadip Sinha, Soumyaranjan, Dash, Souvik Roy, Chitradeep Saha, Shaonwita Pal
- Website: https://www.linkedin.com/in/dibyendu-nandi-50b697b

Dibyendu Nandi (also transliterated 'Dibyendu Nandy) is an Indian Physicist specializing in Astrophysical Magnetohydrodynamics and Space Science. He is widely known for his research related to the Sun and the Solar Cycle and the influence of Solar Activity on Space Weather. Nandi established the Center of Excellence in Space Sciences, India (CESSI) at IISER Kolkata. He was earlier associated with Montana State University, the Center for Astrophysics | Harvard & Smithsonian and IISER Kolkata where he carried out most of his research work. Currently he is a Professor at the Raman Research Institute.

== Education ==
Nandi did his early schooling at the Cossipore English School and St. James School, both in Kolkata. He then graduated in Physics from St. Xavier's College, Kolkata in 1995 and joined Indian Institute of Science from where he received his M.S. and PhD degrees in 1998 and 2003, respectively.

== Career ==
Following his PhD, Nandi worked as a Postdoctoral Fellow, Research Scientist and Assistant Research Professor at the Solar Physics Group at Montana State University, Bozeman, USA. He returned to India in 2008 and joined the faculty of the Indian Institute of Science Education and Research Kolkata. At IISER Kolkata he served as the Dean of Research and Development, and was founder Head of Center of Excellence in Space Science India, a multi-institusional centre involving collaborating faculty from ISRO, Inter-University Centre for Astronomy and Astrophysics, Indian Institute of Astrophysics, Raman Research Institute, IISER Pune, IIT Indore and Udaipur Solar Observatory. At present he is a Senior Professor at the Raman Research Institute in Bengaluru, India.

He has held visiting faculty positions at the Institute of Mathematics and Statistics at St Andrews University (UK), the Center for Astrophysics | Harvard & Smithsonian (USA), Georgia State University Atlanta, and a Wenner Gren Professorship at the Nordic Institute of Theoretical Physics NORDITA in Stockholm (Sweden).

Nandi is currently the President of Commission E4 of the International Astronomical Union, Co-coordinator of the ISWAT cluster on long-term solar activity predictions for the Committee on Space Research and a Co-Investigator of the Solar Ultraviolet Imaging Telescope (SUIT) onboard India's maiden solar space observatory Aditya-L1. Previously, he was Vice Chair of the COSPAR Space Weather Panel and Chairperson of the Public Outreach and Education Committee of the Astronomical Society of India. He has led the Aditya-L1 Space Weather Monitoring and Predictions Planning Committee for ISRO and the drafting of India's solar and heliospheric physics decadal vision document. He was also an expert member contributor to India's Megascience Vision Document 2035 on Astronomy and Astrophysics for the Office of Principal Scientific Adviser to the Government of India.

== Scientific Contributions ==
Nandi’s research focuses on the intersection of fundamental physics of solar activity, space weather and its applications for protection of space-reliant technologies. Specifically, his most significant contributions have been on the magnetohydrodynamic (MHD) dynamo mechanism of stars, solar activity fluctuations, influence of stellar magnetism on planetary and exoplanetary environments, predictability of non-linear MHD systems and the development of computational models for space weather forecasting.

== Awards and recognition ==
Dibyendu Nandi was the 2012 recipient of the Karen Harvey Prize of the American Astronomical Society for significant contributions to the study of the Sun early in a person’s professional career This was the first time that a space scientist working in the Asia-Pacific region received this honour. He was conferred the Modali Award of the Astronomical Society of India for notable and outstanding research contributions in astronomy, astrophysics and planetary sciences, the Peraiah Foundation Lectureship for exceptional contributions to theoretical astrophysics awarded to scientists below the age of 50 working in India, and the Young Career Prize of the Asia Pacific Solar Physics Society awarded to solar physicists from the Asia-Pacific region. Earlier, he had received a Eugene Parker Lectureship of the American Astronomical Society and the Martin Forster Gold Medal awarded for the best PhD thesis of the Division of Physical and Mathematical Sciences of the Indian Institute of Science.
