= Braginsky =

Braginsky, sometimes spelled Braginskiy (Russian: Брагинский), or Braginskaya (feminine; Брагинская) is a Slavic surname. Notable people with the surname include:

- Alexander Braginsky (born 1944), Russian pianist
- Emil Braginsky (1921–1998), Russian writer and actor
- Iosif Braginsky (1905–1989), a Soviet orientalist
- Ivan Braginsky, (Also spelled as Braginski), the human name chosen for the personification of Russia from the anime series Axis Powers Hetalia
- Nina V. Braginskaya, professor at the Institute of Classical Orient and Antiquity of the Higher School of Economics in Moscow
- Rene Braginsky, a notable Swiss collector of Jewish Manuscripts and Artwork
- Stanislav I. Braginsky, research geophysicist
- Vladimir Braginsky, a Russian physicist
- Colin Braginsky is a Swiss long-distance runner (5 km - half marathon) who won the bronze medal at the Maccabiah Games 2015 in Berlin for his half marathon. In 2017, he also won a bronze medal at the Maccabiah Games 2017 in Jerusalem together with an international team in a 4*100m mixed relay. In 2019 he won the gold medal of his age category in half marathon at the Maccabiah Games in Budapest. Braginsky played football for over 20 years as a defender for FC JTV Basel, a football club in Basel.
