= David Acheson =

David Acheson may refer to:

- David Acheson (mathematician) (born 1946), British applied mathematician
- David Campion Acheson (1921−2018), American attorney, lawyer and son of former United States secretary of state Dean Acheson

== See also ==
- David Rice Atchison (1807–1886), U.S. senator from Missouri
