= Fossil stellar magnetic field =

Fossil stellar magnetic fields or fossil fields are stable stellar magnetic fields proposed as possible interstellar magnetic fields that became locked into certain stars or that were previously generated by pre-main sequence dynamos or stellar mergers.

== See also ==
- Stellar magnetic field
