= Parker theorem =

Parker theorem, or the fundamental magnetostatic theorem, was formulated by physicist Eugene Parker in 1972. Parker's theorem describes how magnetic fields behave in perfectly conducting fluids, particularly in space plasmas. The theorem states that three-dimensional magnetic fields naturally form infinitesimally thin current sheets – regions where the magnetic field direction changes abruptly. These sheets arise from the fundamental interaction between magnetic fields that are "frozen" into the conducting fluid.

When different magnetic field regions come into contact, they cannot smoothly merge due to the perfect conductivity of the fluid. Instead, they form sharp boundaries where electric currents flow. This process is analogous to how non-mixing fluids like oil and water form distinct boundaries rather than mixing. The theorem's central claim is that such discontinuities are not exceptional but are the standard feature of magnetic field equilibria in perfectly conducting fluids.
