= Vaughan–Preston gap =

In astronomy, the Vaughan–Preston gap is an observed absence of F-, G- and K-type stars with intermediate levels of magnetic activity. In 1980, Vaughan and Preston noted there were two populations of stars of these classifications, with either high or low levels of activity, separated by an apparent gap. There remains no consensus on the cause of the gap.
