= Magnetic buoyancy =

Force on magnetic flux tubes

In plasma physics, magnetic buoyancy is an upward force exerted on magnetic flux tubes that are immersed in electrically conducting fluids and are under the influence of a gravitational force. It acts on magnetic flux tubes in stellar convection zones where it plays an important role in the formation of sunspots and starspots. It was first proposed by Eugene Parker in 1955.

== Magnetic flux tubes ==
For a magnetic flux tube in hydrostatic equilibrium with the surrounding medium, the tube's interior magnetic pressure $p_m$ and fluid pressure $p_i$ must be balanced by the fluid pressure $p_e$ of the exterior medium, that is,

$$p_e = p_i + p_m.$$

The magnetic pressure is always positive, so $p_e > p_i.$ As such, assuming that the temperature of the plasma within the flux tube is the same as the temperature of the surrounding plasma, the density of the flux tube must be lower than the density of the surrounding medium. Under the influence of a gravitational force, the tube will rise.

== Instability ==
The magnetic buoyancy instability is a plasma instability that can arise from small perturbations in systems where magnetic buoyancy is present. The magnetic buoyancy instability in a system with magnetic field $\mathbf{B}$ and perturbation wavevector $\mathbf{k}$, has three modes: the interchange instability where the perturbation wavevector is perpendicular to the magnetic field direction $\left(\mathbf{k}\perp\mathbf{B}\right)$; the undular instability, sometimes referred to as the Parker instability or magnetic Rayleigh–Taylor instability, where the perturbation wavevector is parallel to the magnetic field direction $\left(\mathbf{k}\parallel\mathbf{B}\right)$; and the mixed instability, sometimes referred to as the quasi-interchange instability, a combination of the interchange and undular instabilities.

== Parker instability in astrophysics ==
In astrophysics, the Parker instability is a magnetohydrodynamic instability in a gas layer where a horizontal magnetic field supports gas against gravity, causing it to become buoyant and rise. This buoyancy, driven by magnetic fields and cosmic ray pressure, leads to the formation of magnetic loops, gas outflow, and can influence star formation and the structure of the interstellar medium. It is a fundamental process affecting galactic dynamics and is modified by factors like rotation, cooling, and the degree of cosmic ray isotropy. It is sometimes called magnetic buoyancy. Parker instability is a Rayleigh-Taylor-like instability.

It was first studied by Eugene Parker in 1966.

Parker instability is associated with molecular cloud formation, and can be triggered in the arms of spiral galaxies.
