= David Acheson (mathematician) =

British mathematician

- Born: 1946 (age 79–80)
- Education: King's College London; University of East Anglia
- Scientific career
- Workplaces: University of Oxford
- Thesis: The Magnetohydrodynamics of Rotating Fluids (1971)
- Doctoral advisor: Michael Barker Glauert

David John Acheson (born 1946) is a British applied mathematician at Jesus College, Oxford.

== Career ==
He was educated at Highgate School, King's College London (BSc Mathematics and Physics, 1967) and the University of East Anglia (PhD, 1971). He was appointed a Fellow in Mathematics at Jesus College, Oxford in 1977 and became an emeritus Fellow in 2008. He served as president of the Mathematical Association from 2010 to 2011. He was awarded an Honorary Doctorate of Science from the University of East Anglia in 2013.

== Research ==
His early research was on geophysical and astrophysical fluid dynamics, beginning with the discovery in 1972 of a magnetic 'field gradient' instability in rotating fluids. In 1976, he discovered the first examples of wave over-reflection (i.e. reflection coefficient greater than unity) in a stable system. In 1978 his research focused on magnetic fields and differential rotation in stars, with new results on magnetic buoyancy, the Taylor instability, Goldreich-Schubert instability, and magnetorotational instability. In 1992 he discovered the 'upside-down pendulums theorem' (which is very loosely connected with the Indian Rope Trick).

== Publications ==
=== Books ===
- David J. Acheson (1990). Elementary Fluid Dynamics. Oxford University Press. ISBN 978-0198596790.
- David J. Acheson (1997). From Calculus to Chaos: An Introduction to Dynamics. Oxford University Press. ISBN 978-0198500773.
- David J. Acheson (2002). 1089 and All That: A Journey into Mathematics. Oxford University Press. ISBN 978-0199590025.
- David J. Acheson (2017). The Calculus Story: A Mathematical Adventure. Oxford University Press. ISBN 978-0198804543.
- David J. Acheson (2020). The Wonder Book of Geometry: A Mathematical Story. Oxford University Press. ISBN 978-0198846383.
- David J. Acheson (2023). The Spirit of Mathematics: Algebra and all that. Oxford University Press. ISBN 978-0192845085.
