= Stanislav Braginsky =

Geophysicist

Stanislav I. Braginsky was a Research Geophysicist at UCLA.

In 1964, he contributed to models of the geodynamo with his theory of the "nearly symmetric dynamo", published 1964. He emigrated from the Soviet Union to the United States in 1988.

In 1992, the American Geophysical Union awarded him the John Adam Fleming Medal for contributions to geomagnetism.

== Selected publications ==
- — (1965). "Self-excitation of a magnetic field during motion of a highly conducting fluid". Soviet Physics JETP-USSR. 20 (3): 726.
- — (1984). "Short-period geomagnetic secular variation". Geophysical & Astrophysical Fluid Dynamics. 30 (1–2): 1–78. doi:10.1080/03091928408210077.
- —; Roberts, Paul H. (1987). "A model-Z geodynamo". Geophysical & Astrophysical Fluid Dynamics. 38 (4): 327–349. Bibcode:1987GApFD..38..327B. doi:10.1080/03091928708210113.
- —; Meytlis, V. P. (1990). "Local turbulence in the Earth's core". Geophysical & Astrophysical Fluid Dynamics. 55 (2): 71–87. Bibcode:1990GApFD..55...71B. doi:10.1080/03091929008203556.
- —; Roberts, Paul H. (1995). "Equations governing convection in earth's core and the geodynamo". Geophysical & Astrophysical Fluid Dynamics. 79 (1–4): 1–97. Bibcode:1995GApFD..79....1B. doi:10.1080/03091929508228992. hdl:2433/60678.
