= Mausumi Dikpati =

Indian astronomer

- Born: Mausumi Dikpati; India
- Other name: Dikpati
- Occupation: Scientist
- Known for: Solar Physics, Solar Astrophysics
- Notable work: Solar Rossby waves modeling, observational analysis and implications for space weather

Mausumi Dikpati is a scientist at the High Altitude Observatory operated by the National Center for Atmospheric Research. Her main scientific area is modeling the dynamics and magnetohydrodynamical (MHD) of the solar interior and dynamo. The main focus is: Global MHD of dynamo-generated magnetic fields and Atmospheric Research (AR) emergence patterns.

== Education ==
Mausumi studied at Brajabala Girls' High School, Bethune School, Lady Brabourne College and Calcutta University of Calcutta, India. Her graduation and post graduation are in Physics. She completed Post M.Sc in Associateship in Physics at the Saha Institute of Nuclear Physics of Calcutta, India. She achieved her PhD from the Indian Institute of Science Bangalore, India in 1996. ‍She completed her Post Doc at the Advanced Study Program and High Altitude Observatory, NCAR, Boulder, USA.

== Research ==
In March 2006, she predicted the strength and timing of the next solar cycle based on simulations of the astrophysics of the solar interior. During 2006-2007 Mausumi Dikpati issued three predictions for solar cycle 24 -- (i) a delayed onset of solar cycle 24 which would start in late 2008 instead of 2006, (ii) a strong solar cycle 24 whose peak would be 30%-50% stronger than the previous cycle ('Cycle 23'), and (iii) the solar cycle in southern hemisphere would be stronger than that in the northern hemisphere of the Sun. Two of these three predictions, (i) and (iii) came true. Her research paper explaining the cause of delayed onset of solar cycle 24 was one of the top 100 discoveries in the Discover Magazine. Currently she is improving her solar dynamo model by building a more accurate dynamo-based solar cycle prediction tool which can assimilate solar magnetic fields and flow data in ways used in oceanic and atmospheric predictions.

In a recent work published in Geophysical Research Letters, Dr. Mausumi Dikpati of the High Altitude Observatory National Center for Atmospheric Research in Boulder, Colorado, and her team modeled Mount Wilson Observatory data throughout the course of the previous solar cycle. When they investigated and modeled surface Doppler data of plasma currents flowing beneath the Sun's surface, they discovered that the flow went all the way to the poles.

== Major Scientific Accomplishments ==
=== Solar magneto hydrodynamics, Rossby waves and space weather ===
- 2009 - 2012: Developed the first fully nonlinear quasi-3D shallow water model (ApJ, 745, 128, 2012) to calculate interaction of tachocline latitudinal differential rotation with Rossby waves.
- 2015 - 2018: Discovered Tachocline Nonlinear Oscillations, which drive “seasons” in Space Weather (Nature, 2017) through quasi-periodic exchange of energies among solar differential rotation, magnetic fields and Rossby waves, with 6–18 months’ periodicity.
- 2019 – 2020: AGU Grand challenge paper on the future outlook on space weather on intermediate-scale (few to several weeks), one of the 100 papers for celebrating 100th anniversary of AGU. This effort led to a major publication of 30 pages, and to a science highlight in Physics World and an AGU research spotlight.
- 2021-2022: Deciphered deep origin of surface active regions, due to interaction of Rossby waves and spot-producing magnetic fields (ApJ, 922, 46, 13pp, 2021)
- 2022–present: Solar Rossby waves modeling, observational analysis and implications for space weather

=== Data assimilation in solar models ===
- 2012 - 2016: Built the foundation of EnKF data assimilation in a solar dynamo model. This work demonstrates how the combination of model, observations and data assimilation can reconstruct the Sun’s meridional flow-speed variation and shows the potential to derive the spatio-temporal pattern of meridional circulation. This effort led to two major publications, one of which (GRL, 41, L5361, 2014) led to a news release and an AGU research spotlight.
- 2019 – 2020: Developed TNO-DART Model-system for simulating and predicting longitude distribution of active regions (first results are published in Space Weather, 2020, e2018SW002109)
- 2022 – present: Developing Ensemble simulations for estimating inherent predictability limit for forecasting upcoming bursty solar activity “season”

== Publications ==
“Solar/stellar Dynamos as revealed by Helio- and Asteroseismology”, ASPSC, volume 416, pp648, Eds.: Dikpati, M., T. Arentoft, I. Gonzalez-Hernandez, C. Lindsay and F. Hill, Date: 2010

== Honors and awards ==
- 2017: Wenner-Gren Guest Professorship Award of Stockholm
- 2010: Research article on extended minimum recognized as one of the top 100 discoveries in the DISCOVER Magazine
