= Striation =

Striations means a series of ridges, furrows or linear marks, and is used in several ways:

- Glacial striation
- Striation (fatigue), in material
- Striation (geology), a striation as a result of a geological fault
- Striation Valley, in Antarctica
- In hyperbolic geometry, a striation is a reflection across two parallel mirrors.
- In anatomy, striated muscle
- In acoustic phonetics, striations are vertical bands on a spectrogram associated with pulses of the vocal folds when producing voiced periodic sounds.
- Striations can be found in certain glasses. These have been caused by turbulent flow during teeming (pouring) of the glass.
- Striations can be observed in clouds. See Barber's pole.
- Ballistic fingerprinting
