= Antidynamo theorem =

Restriction of the type of magnetic fields produced by dynamo action

In physics and in particular in the theory of magnetism, an antidynamo theorem is one of several results that restrict the type of magnetic fields that may be produced by dynamo action.

One notable example is Thomas Cowling's antidynamo theorem which states that no axisymmetric magnetic field can be maintained through a self-sustaining dynamo action by an axially symmetric current. Similarly, Zeldovich's antidynamo theorem states that a two-dimensional, planar flow cannot maintain the dynamo action.

== Consequences ==
Apart from the Earth's magnetic field, some other bodies such as Jupiter and Saturn, and the Sun have significant magnetic fields whose major component is a dipole, an axisymmetric magnetic field. These magnetic fields are self-sustained through fluid motion in the Sun or planets, with the necessary non-symmetry for the planets deriving from the Coriolis force caused by their rapid rotation, and one cause of non-symmetry for the Sun being its differential rotation.

The magnetic fields of planets with slow rotation periods and/or solid cores, such as Mercury, Venus, and Mars, have dissipated to almost nothing by comparison.

The impact of the known anti-dynamo theorems is that successful dynamos do not possess a high degree of symmetry.

== See also ==
- Dynamo theory
- Magnetosphere of Jupiter
- Magnetosphere of Saturn
