= Elsasser number =

The Elsasser number, Λ, is a dimensionless number in magnetohydrodynamics that represents the ratio of magnetic forces to the Coriolis force.

$$\Lambda = \frac{\sigma B^2}{\rho \Omega}$$

where σ is the conductivity of the fluid, B is the magnetic field, ρ is the density of the fluid, and Ω is the rate of rotation of the body.

== Applications ==
This number is useful when studying the linear stability of an accretion disc to the magnetorotational instability.
