= Solar dynamo =

Physical process that generates a star's magnetic field

The solar dynamo is a physical process that generates the Sun's magnetic field. It is explained with a variant of the dynamo theory. A naturally occurring electric generator in the Sun's interior produces electric currents and a magnetic field, following the laws of Ampère, Faraday and Ohm, as well as the laws of fluid dynamics, which together form the laws of magnetohydrodynamics. The detailed mechanism of the solar dynamo is not known and is the subject of current research.

== Mechanism ==
A dynamo converts kinetic energy into electric-magnetic energy. An electrically conducting fluid with shear or more complicated motion, such as turbulence, can temporarily amplify a magnetic field through Lenz's law: fluid motion relative to a magnetic field induces electric currents in the fluid that distort the initial field. If the fluid motion is sufficiently complicated, it can sustain its own magnetic field, with advective fluid amplification essentially balancing diffusive or ohmic decay. Such systems are called self-sustaining dynamos. The Sun is a self-sustaining dynamo that converts convective motion and differential rotation within the Sun to electric-magnetic energy.

Currently, the geometry and width of the tachocline are hypothesized to play an important role in models of the solar dynamo by winding up the weaker poloidal field to create a much stronger toroidal field. However, recent radio observations of cooler stars and brown dwarfs, which do not have a radiative core and only have a convection zone, have demonstrated that they maintain large-scale, solar-strength magnetic fields and display solar-like activity despite the absence of tachoclines. This suggests that the convection zone alone may be responsible for the function of the solar dynamo.

== Solar cycle ==
The most prominent time variation of the solar magnetic field is related to the quasi-periodic 11-year solar cycle, characterized by an increasing and decreasing number and size of sunspots. Sunspots are visible as dark patches on the Sun's photosphere and correspond to concentrations of magnetic field. At a typical solar minimum, few or no sunspots are visible. Those that do appear are at high solar latitudes. As the solar cycle progresses towards its maximum, sunspots tend to form closer to the solar equator, following Spörer's law.

The 11-year sunspot cycle is half of a 22-year Babcock–Leighton solar dynamo cycle, which corresponds to an oscillatory exchange of energy between toroidal and poloidal solar magnetic fields. At solar-cycle maximum, the external poloidal dipolar magnetic field is near its dynamo-cycle minimum strength, but an internal toroidal quadrupolar field, generated through differential rotation within the tachocline, is near its maximum strength. At this point in the dynamo cycle, buoyant upwelling within the convection zone forces emergence of the toroidal magnetic field through the photosphere, giving rise to pairs of sunspots, roughly aligned east–west with opposite magnetic polarities. The magnetic polarity of sunspot pairs alternates every solar cycle, a phenomenon known as the Hale cycle.

During the solar cycle's declining phase, energy shifts from the internal toroidal magnetic field to the external poloidal field, and sunspots diminish in number. At solar minimum, the toroidal field is, correspondingly, at minimum strength, sunspots are relatively rare and the poloidal field is at maximum strength. During the next cycle, differential rotation converts magnetic energy back from the poloidal to the toroidal field, with a polarity that is opposite to the previous cycle. The process carries on continuously, and in an idealized, simplified scenario, each 11-year sunspot cycle corresponds to a change in the polarity of the Sun's large-scale magnetic field. Long minima of solar activity can be associated with the interaction between double dynamo waves of the solar magnetic field caused by the beating effect of the wave interference.

== See also ==
- Stellar magnetic field
- Solar phenomena
- Atmospheric dynamo
