= Schwarzschild criterion =

Mathematical inequality in astrophysics

In astrophysics, the Schwarzschild criterion indicates when a stellar medium is stable against convection.

== Definition ==
The criterion is defined by the condition when the rate of change of temperature, $T$, by altitude, $z$, satisfies

$$-\frac{dT}{dz} < \frac{g}{c_p}$$

where $g$ is gravity and $c_p$ is the specific heat capacity at constant pressure. The criterion is named after its discoverer, Martin Schwarzschild.

== Physical interpretation ==
If a gas is unstable against convection then if an element is displaced upwards its buoyancy will cause it to keep rising or, if it is displaced downwards, it is denser than its surroundings and will continue to sink. Therefore, the Schwarzschild criterion dictates whether an element of a star will rise or sink if displaced by random fluctuations within the star or if the forces the element experiences will return it to its original position.

== Applicability ==
For the Schwarzschild criterion to hold the displaced element must have a bulk velocity which is highly subsonic. If this is the case then the time over which the pressures surrounding the element changes is much longer than the time it takes for a sound wave to travel through the element and smooth out pressure differences between the element and its surroundings. If this were not the case the element would not hold together as it traveled through the star.

In order to keep rising or sinking in the star the displaced element must not be able to become the same density as the gas surrounding it. In other words, it must respond adiabatically to its surroundings. In order for this to be true it must move fast enough for there to be insufficient time for the element to exchange heat with its surroundings.

== In astrophysics ==
In stellar modeling, the Schwarzschild criterion is often written in terms of the stellar and adiabatic temperature gradients, where the adiabatic temperature gradient is defined as

$$\nabla_{\text{ad}} = \left( \frac{\partial \ln T}{\partial \ln P} \right)_{\text{ad}},$$

for pressure $P$ and temperature $T$. The adiabatic gradient differs from the stellar gradient in that it only depends on the equation of state rather than temperature stratification within the star, as temperature may be dependent on pressure. The criterion states that if:

$\nabla_T < \nabla_{\text{ad}}$, the medium is stable against convection, while if

$\nabla_T > \nabla_{\text{ad}}$, the medium is unstable against convection.

== See also ==
- Archimedes' principle
- Brunt–Väisälä frequency
- Convection
