= Convection zone =

Region of a star

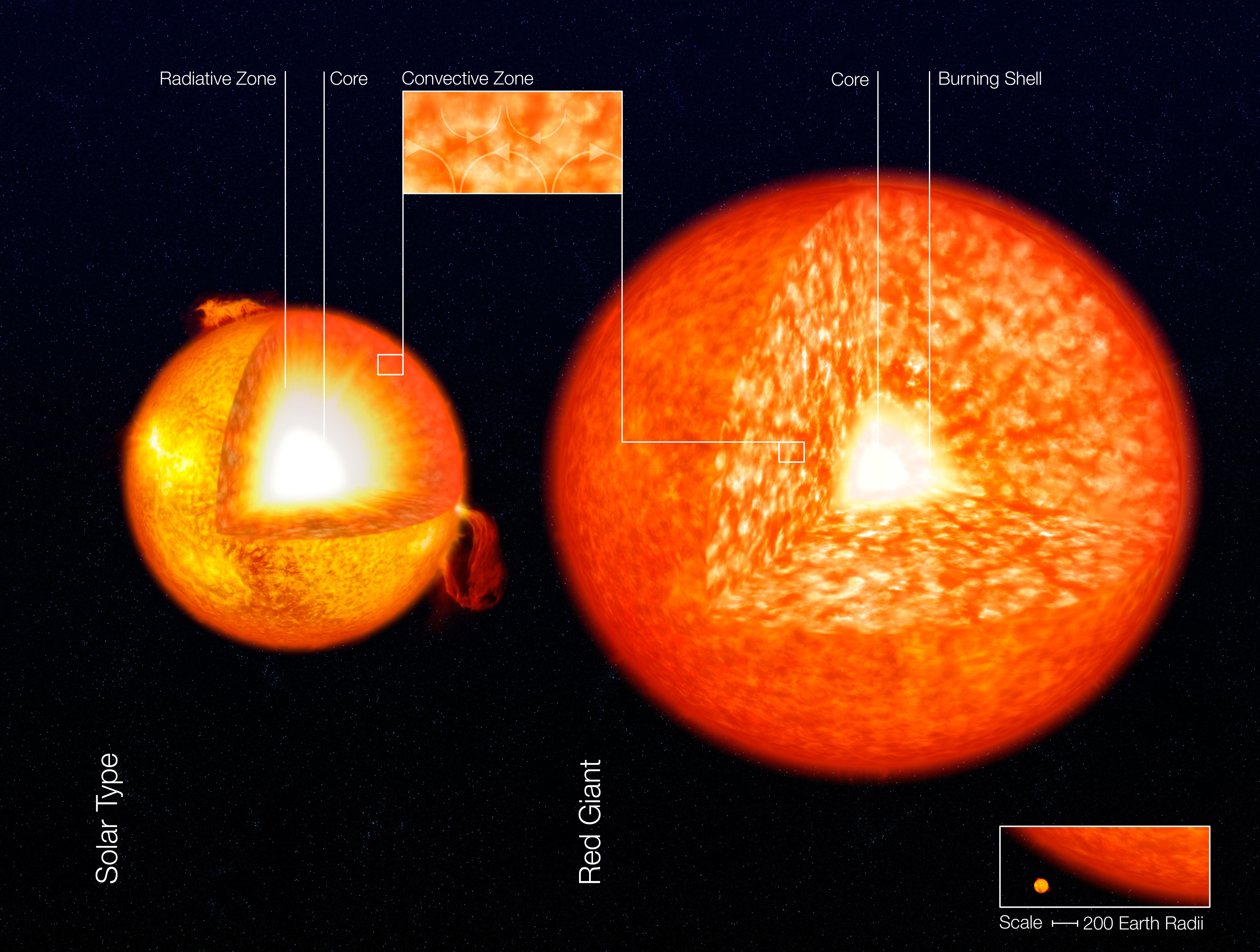
An illustration of the structure of the Sun and a red giant star, showing their convective zones. These are the granular zones in the outer layers of the stars.

A convection zone of a star is a layer which is unstable due to convection. Energy is primarily or partially transported by convection in such a region. In a radiation zone, energy is transported by radiation and conduction.

Stellar convection consists of mass movement of plasma within the star which usually forms a circular convection current with the heated plasma ascending and the cooled plasma descending.

The Schwarzschild criterion expresses the conditions under which a region of a star is unstable to convection. A parcel of gas that rises slightly will find itself in an environment of lower pressure than the one it came from. As a result, the parcel will expand and cool. If the rising parcel cools to a lower temperature than its new surroundings, so that it has a higher density than the surrounding gas, then its lack of buoyancy will cause it to sink back to where it came from. However, if the temperature gradient is steep enough (i.e. the temperature changes rapidly with distance from the center of the star), or if the gas has a very high heat capacity (i.e. its temperature changes relatively slowly as it expands) then the rising parcel of gas will remain warmer and less dense than its new surroundings even after expanding and cooling. Its buoyancy will then cause it to continue to rise. The region of the star in which this happens is the convection zone.

== Main sequence stars ==
In main sequence stars more than 1.3 times the mass of the Sun, the high core temperature causes nuclear fusion of hydrogen into helium to occur predominantly via the carbon-nitrogen-oxygen (CNO) cycle instead of the less temperature-sensitive proton–proton chain. The high temperature gradient in the core region forms a convection zone that slowly mixes the hydrogen fuel with the helium product. The core convection zone of these stars is overlaid by a radiation zone that is in thermal equilibrium and undergoes little or no mixing. In the most massive stars, the convection zone may reach all the way from the core to the surface.

In main sequence stars of less than about 1.3 solar masses, the outer envelope of the star contains a region where partial ionization of hydrogen and helium raises the heat capacity. The relatively low temperature in this region simultaneously causes the opacity due to heavier elements to be high enough to produce a steep temperature gradient. This combination of circumstances produces an outer convection zone, the top of which is visible in the Sun as solar granulation. Low-mass main-sequence stars, such as red dwarfs below 0.35 solar masses, as well as pre-main sequence stars on the Hayashi track, are convective throughout and do not contain a radiation zone.

In main sequence stars similar to the Sun, which have a radiative core and convective envelope, the transition region between the convection zone and the radiation zone is called the tachocline.

== Red giants ==
In red giant stars, and particularly during the asymptotic giant branch phase, the surface convection zone varies in depth during the phases of shell burning. This causes dredge-up events, short-lived very deep convection zones that transport fusion products to the surface of the star.
