= Ionization instability =

An ionization instability is any one of a category of plasma instabilities which is mediated by electron-impact ionization. In the most general sense, an ionization instability occurs from a feedback effect, when electrons produced by ionization go on to produce still more electrons through ionization in a self-reinforcing way.

Ionization instabilities have been seen in such plasma physics apparatus as glow discharges, Penning discharges, magnetic nozzles, and MHD generators. Ionization instabilities may occur in magnetized or unmagnetized plasma. They occur mostly when the plasma is relatively cold and only partially ionized, so that there is a lot of neutral gas mixed in with the plasma.

== In a glow discharge ==
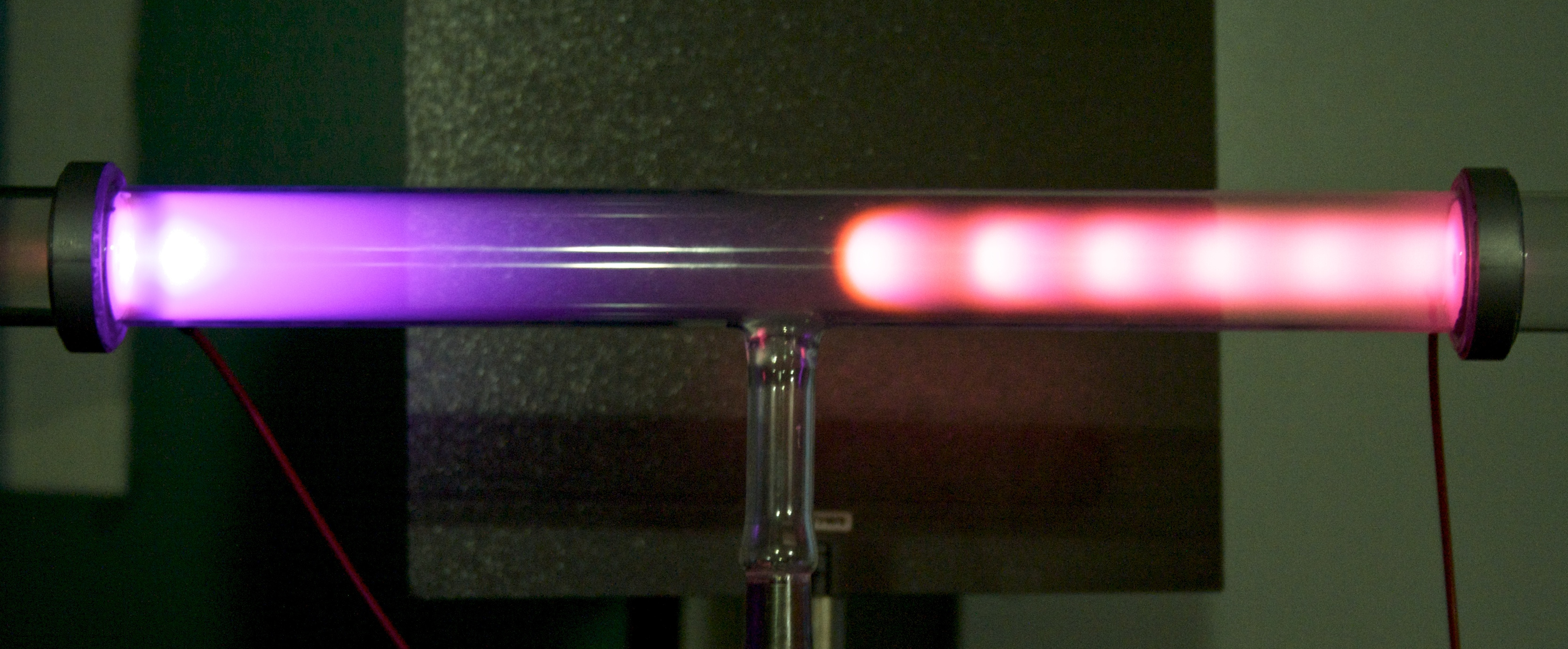
Striations formed by ionization instability can be seen to the right of this glow discharge.

A glow discharge is a plasma-containing apparatus in which the plasma is formed by a large voltage placed across a rarefied gas. Glow discharges are used for electric lighting and materials processing. In a glow discharge, ionization instability takes the form of striations, or bands of enhanced and suppressed light production. The distance between each striation is the distance required for an electron to gain enough energy to ionize a neutral gas particle.

== In a magnetic nozzle ==
A magnetic nozzle is an apparatus through which plasma flows, in which the plasma is constricted by a magnetic field. Magnetic nozzles are used in electric propulsion to enhance the thrust produced by a stream of plasma. In magnetic nozzles, ionization instability is caused by ionization downstream of the nozzle, causing electrons born there to migrate upstream, counter to the direction of flow. This causes the plasma flow rate and energy through the nozzle to oscillate.

== In an MHD generator ==
An MHD generator is an apparatus through which hot gas flows, in which the gas is ionized and a magnetic field is used to extract flow energy as electrical energy. MHD generators were studied mostly in the 1960s and 1970s to increase the efficiency of fossil-fueled and nuclear-fission power plants. In MHD generators, the specific kind of magnetized ionization instability is called the electrothermal instability. It was discovered by Evgeny Velikhov in 1962. The added electrical resistance caused by ionization instability thwarted a research effort to lower the required temperature by heating electrons preferentially.
