= Magnetohydrodynamic drive =

Vehicle propulsion using electromagnetic fields

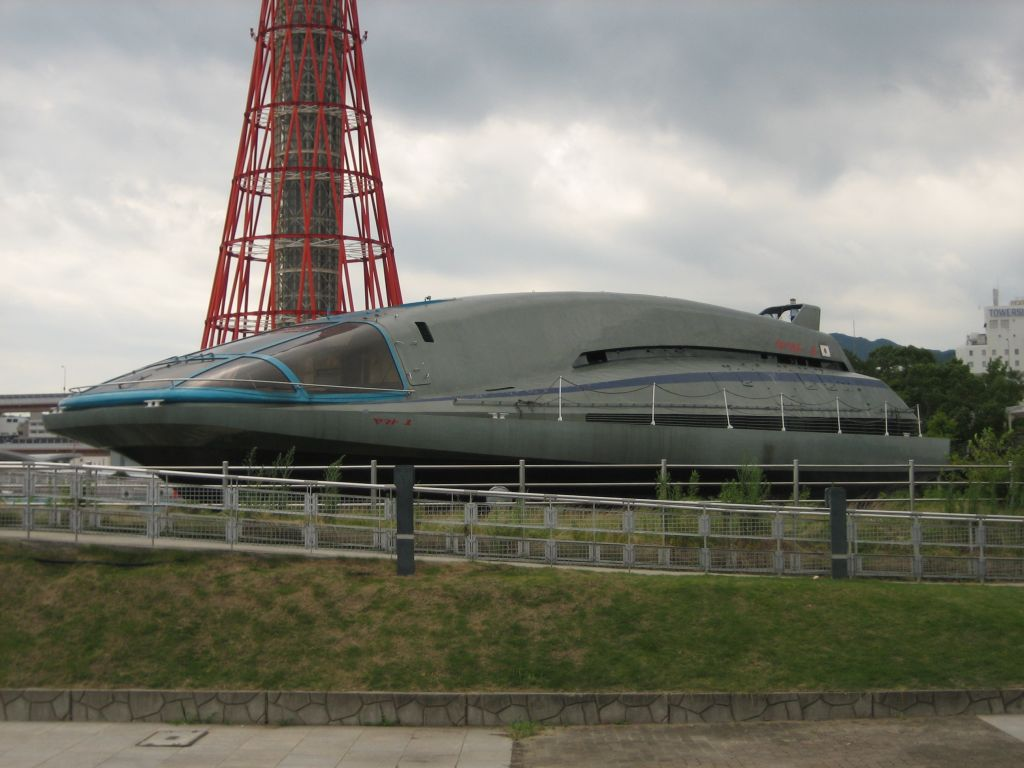
Yamato 1 on display in Kobe, Japan. The first working full-scale MHD ship.

A magnetohydrodynamic drive or MHD accelerator is a method for propelling vehicles using only electric and magnetic fields with no moving parts, accelerating an electrically conductive propellant (liquid or gas) with magnetohydrodynamics. The fluid is directed to the rear and as a reaction, the vehicle accelerates forward.

Studies examining MHD in the field of marine propulsion began in the late 1950s.

Few large-scale marine prototypes have been built, limited by the low electrical conductivity of seawater. Increasing current density is limited by Joule heating and water electrolysis in the vicinity of electrodes, and increasing the magnetic field strength is limited by the cost, size and weight (as well as technological limitations) of electromagnets and the power available to feed them. In 2023 DARPA launched the PUMP program to build a marine engine using superconducting magnets expected to reach a field strength of 20 Tesla.

Stronger technical limitations apply to air-breathing MHD propulsion (where ambient air is ionized) that is still limited to theoretical concepts and early experiments.

Plasma propulsion engines using magnetohydrodynamics for space exploration have also been actively studied as such electromagnetic propulsion offers high thrust and high specific impulse at the same time, and the propellant would last much longer than in chemical rockets.

== Principle ==
Illustration of the right-hand rule for the Lorentz force, cross product of an electric current with a magnetic field.

The working principle involves the acceleration of an electrically conductive fluid (which can be a liquid or an ionized gas called a plasma) by the Lorentz force, resulting from the cross product of an electric current (motion of charge carriers accelerated by an electric field applied between two electrodes) with a perpendicular magnetic field. The Lorentz force accelerates all charged particles, positive and negative species (in opposite directions). If either positive or negative species dominate the vehicle is put in motion in the opposite direction from the net charge.

This is the same working principle as an electric motor (more exactly a linear motor) except that in an MHD drive, the solid moving rotor is replaced by the fluid acting directly as the propellant. As with all electromagnetic devices, an MHD accelerator is reversible: if the ambient working fluid is moving relatively to the magnetic field, charge separation induces an electric potential difference that can be harnessed with electrodes: the device then acts as a power source with no moving parts, transforming the kinetic energy of the incoming fluid into electricity, called an MHD generator.

Crossed-field magnetohydrodynamic converters (linear Faraday type with segmented electrodes). A: MHD generator mode. B: MHD accelerator mode.

As the Lorentz force in an MHD converter does not act on a single isolated charged particle nor on electrons in a solid electrical wire, but on a continuous charge distribution in motion, it is a "volumetric" (body) force, a force per unit volume:

$$\mathbf{f} = \rho \mathbf{E} + \mathbf{J} \times \mathbf{B}\,\!$$

where f is the force density (force per unit volume), ρ the charge density (charge per unit volume), E the electric field, J the current density (current per unit area) and B the magnetic field.

== Typology ==
MHD thrusters are classified in two categories according to the way the electromagnetic fields operate:

- Conduction devices when a direct current flows in the fluid due to an applied voltage between pairs of electrodes, the magnetic field being steady.
- Induction devices when alternating currents are induced by a rapidly varying magnetic field, as eddy currents. No electrodes are required in this case.

As induction MHD accelerators are electrodeless, they do not exhibit the common issues related to conduction systems (especially Joule heating, bubbles and redox from electrolysis) but need much more intense peak magnetic fields to operate. Since one of the biggest issues with such thrusters is the limited energy available on-board, induction MHD drives have not been developed out of the laboratory.

Both systems can put the working fluid in motion according to two main designs:

- Internal flow when the fluid is accelerated within and propelled back out of a nozzle of tubular or ring-shaped cross-section, the MHD interaction being concentrated within the pipe (similarly to rocket or jet engines).
- External flow when the fluid is accelerated around the whole wetted area of the vehicle, the electromagnetic fields extending around the body of the vehicle. The propulsion force results from the pressure distribution on the shell (as lift on a wing, or how ciliate microorganisms such as Paramecium move water around them).

Internal flow systems concentrate the MHD interaction in a limited volume, preserving stealth characteristics. External field systems on the contrary have the ability to act on a very large expanse of surrounding water volume with higher efficiency and the ability to decrease drag, increasing the efficiency even further.

=== Marine propulsion ===
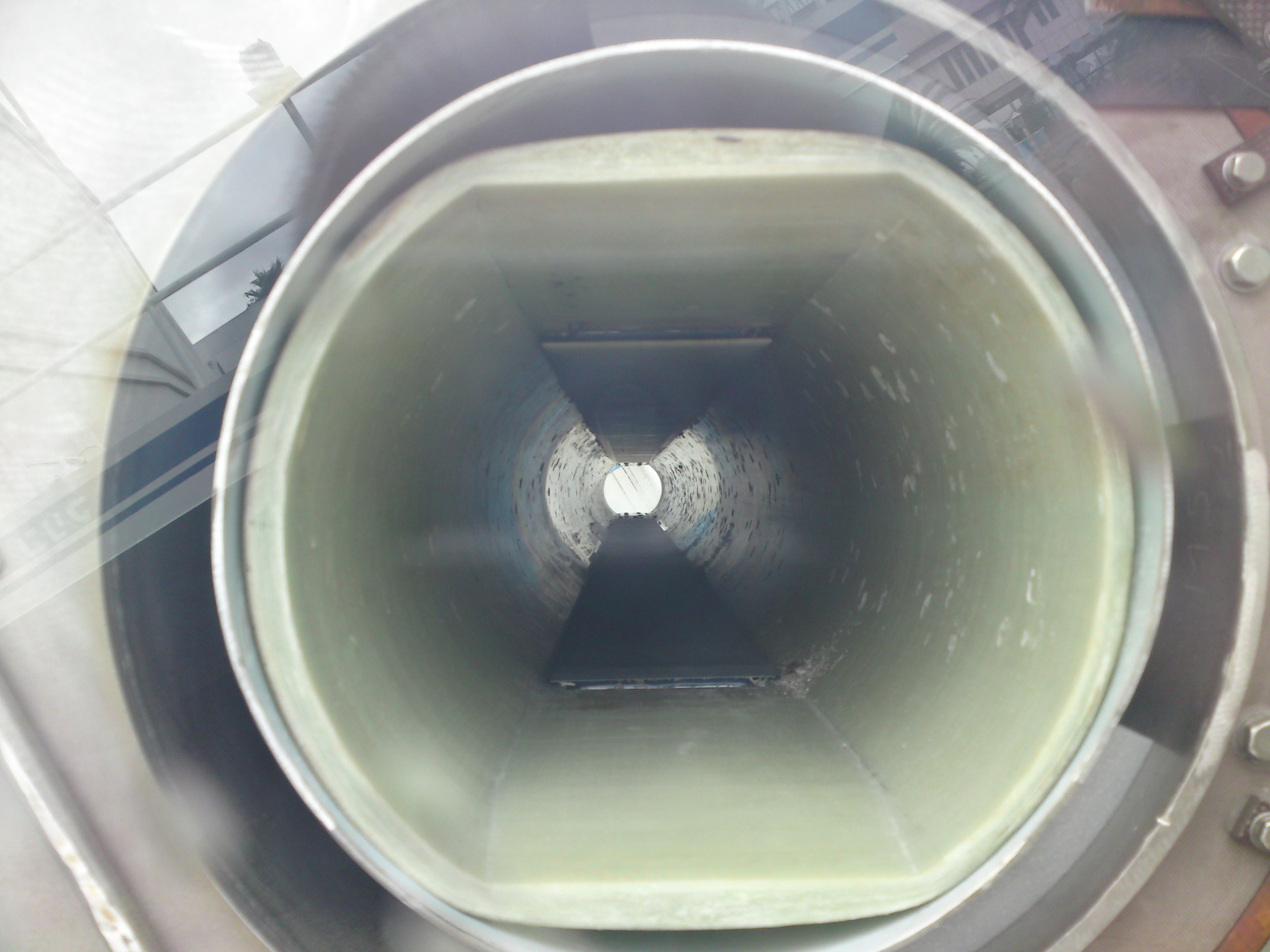
A view through a tube in the thruster of Yamato I, at the Ship Science Museum in Tokyo. The electrode plates are visible top and bottom.

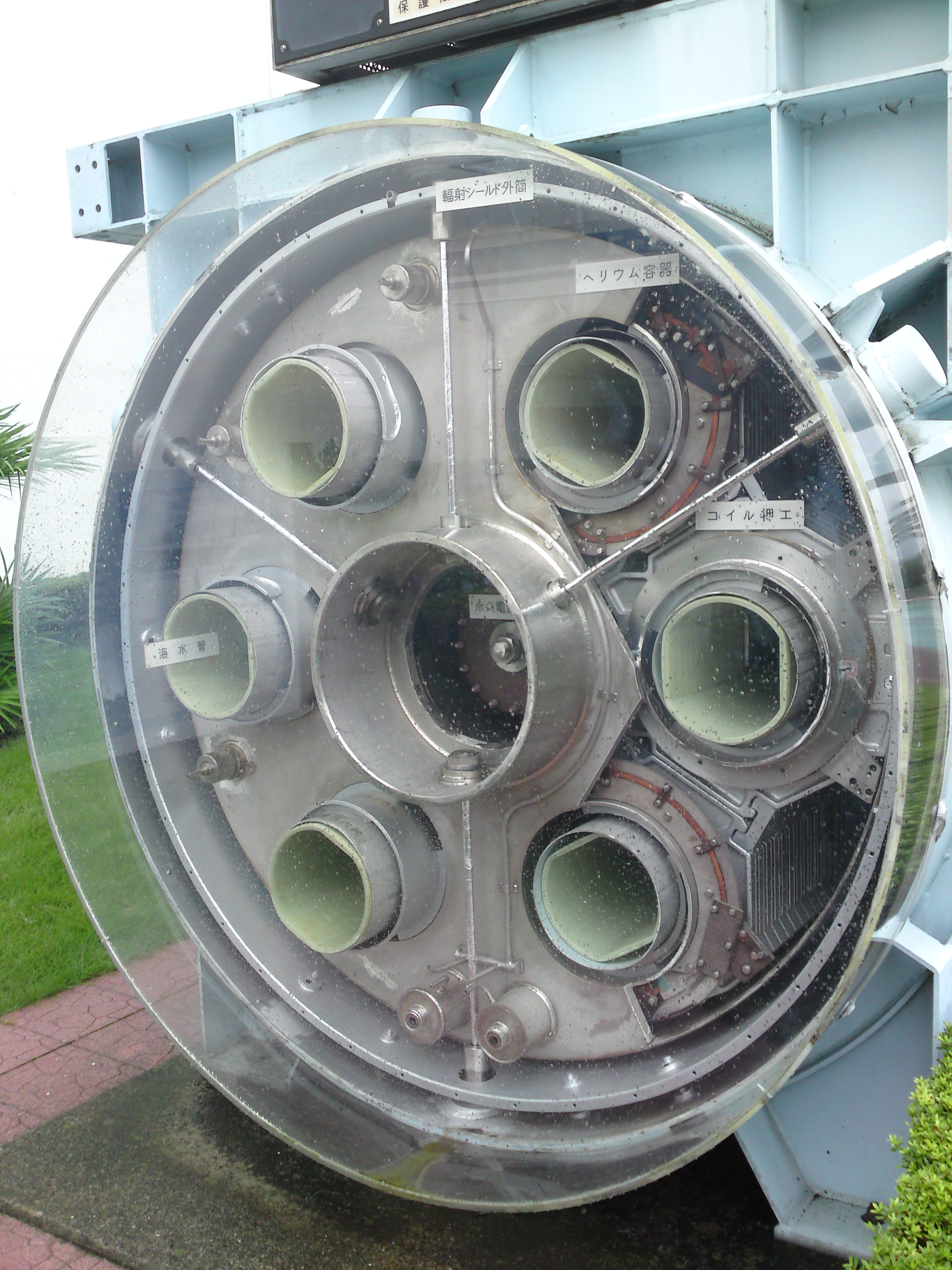
A view of the end of the thruster unit from Yamato I, at the Ship Science Museum in Tokyo

MHD has no moving parts, which means that a good design might be silent, reliable, and efficient. Additionally, the MHD design eliminates many of the wear and friction pieces of the drivetrain with a directly driven propeller by an engine. Problems with current technologies include expense and slow speed compared to a propeller driven by an engine. The extra expense is from the large generator that must be driven by an engine. Such a large generator is not required when an engine directly drives a propeller.

The first prototype, a 3-meter (10-feet) long submarine called EMS-1, was designed and tested in 1966 by Stewart Way, a professor of mechanical engineering at the University of California, Santa Barbara. Way, on leave from his job at Westinghouse Electric, assigned his senior year undergraduate students to build the operational unit. This MHD submarine operated on batteries delivering power to electrodes and electromagnets, which produced a magnetic field of 0.015 tesla. The cruise speed was about 0.4 meter per second (15 inches per second) during the test in the bay of Santa Barbara, California, in accordance with theoretical predictions.

Later, a Japanese prototype, the 3.6-meter long "ST-500", achieved speeds of up to 0.6 m/s in 1979.

In 1991, the world's first full-size prototype Yamato 1 was completed in Japan after six years of research and development (R&D) by the Ship & Ocean Foundation (later known as the Ocean Policy Research Foundation). The ship successfully carried a crew of ten plus passengers at speeds of up to 15 km/h (8.1 kn) in Kobe Harbour in June 1992.

Small-scale ship models were later built and studied extensively in the laboratory, leading to successful comparisons between the measurements and the theoretical prediction of ship terminal speeds.

Military research about underwater MHD propulsion included high-speed torpedoes, remotely operated underwater vehicles (ROV), autonomous underwater vehicles (AUV), up to larger ones such as submarines.

=== Aircraft propulsion ===
==== Passive flow control ====
First studies of the interaction of plasmas with hypersonic flows around vehicles date back to the late 1950s, with the concept of a new kind of thermal protection system for space capsules during high-speed reentry. As low-pressure air is naturally ionized at such very high velocities and altitude, it was thought to use the effect of a magnetic field produced by an electromagnet to replace thermal ablative shields by a "magnetic shield". Hypersonic ionized flow interacts with the magnetic field, inducing eddy currents in the plasma. The current combines with the magnetic field to give Lorentz forces that oppose the flow and detach the bow shock wave further ahead of the vehicle, lowering the heat flux which is due to the brutal recompression of air behind the stagnation point. Such passive flow control studies are still ongoing, but a large-scale demonstrator has yet to be built.

==== Active flow control ====
Active flow control by MHD force fields on the contrary involves a direct and imperious action of forces to locally accelerate or slow down the airflow, modifying its velocity, direction, pressure, friction, heat flux parameters, in order to preserve materials and engines from stress, allowing hypersonic flight. It is a field of magnetohydrodynamics also called magnetogasdynamics, magnetoaerodynamics or magnetoplasma aerodynamics, as the working fluid is the air (a gas instead of a liquid) ionized to become electrically conductive (a plasma).

Air ionization is achieved at high altitude (electrical conductivity of air increases as atmospheric pressure reduces according to Paschen's law) using various techniques: high voltage electric arc discharge, RF (microwaves) electromagnetic glow discharge, laser, e-beam or betatron, radioactive source... with or without seeding of low ionization potential alkali substances (like caesium) into the flow.

MHD studies applied to aeronautics try to extend the domain of hypersonic planes to higher Mach regimes:

- Action on the boundary layer to prevent laminar flow from becoming turbulent.
- Shock wave mitigation for thermal control and reduction of the wave drag and form drag. Some theoretical studies suggest the flow velocity could be controlled everywhere on the wetted area of an aircraft, so shock waves could be totally cancelled when using enough power.
- Inlet flow control.
- Airflow velocity reduction upstream to feed a scramjet by the use of an MHD generator section combined with an MHD accelerator downstream at the exhaust nozzle, powered by the generator through an MHD bypass system.

The Russian project Ayaks (Ajax) is an example of MHD-controlled hypersonic aircraft concept. A US program also exists to design a hypersonic MHD bypass system, the Hypersonic Vehicle Electric Power System (HVEPS). A working prototype was completed in 2017 under development by General Atomics and the University of Tennessee Space Institute, sponsored by the US Air Force Research Laboratory. These projects aim to develop MHD generators feeding MHD accelerators for a new generation of high-speed vehicles. Such MHD bypass systems are often designed around a scramjet engine, but easier to design turbojets are also considered, as well as subsonic ramjets.

Such studies covers a field of resistive MHD with magnetic Reynolds number ≪ 1 using nonthermal weakly ionized gases, making the development of demonstrators much more difficult to realize than for MHD in liquids. "Cold plasmas" with magnetic fields are subject to the electrothermal instability occurring at a critical Hall parameter, which makes full-scale developments difficult.

==== Prospects ====
MHD propulsion has been considered as the main propulsion system for both marine and space ships since there is no need to produce lift to counter the gravity of Earth in water (due to buoyancy) nor in space (due to weightlessness), which is ruled out in the case of flight in the atmosphere.

Nonetheless, considering the current problem of the electric power source solved (for example with the availability of a still missing multi-megawatt compact fusion reactor), one could imagine future aircraft of a new kind silently powered by MHD accelerators, able to ionize and direct enough air downward to lift several tonnes. As external flow systems can control the flow over the whole wetted area, limiting thermal issues at high speeds, ambient air would be ionized and radially accelerated by Lorentz forces around an axisymmetric body (shaped as a cylinder, a cone, a sphere...), the entire airframe being the engine. Lift and thrust would arise as a consequence of a pressure difference between the upper and lower surfaces, induced by the Coandă effect. In order to maximize such pressure difference between the two opposite sides, and since the most efficient MHD converters (with a high Hall effect) are disk-shaped, such MHD aircraft would be preferably flattened to take the shape of a biconvex lens. Having no wings nor airbreathing jet engines, it would share no similarities with conventional aircraft, but it would behave like a helicopter whose rotor blades would have been replaced by a "purely electromagnetic rotor" with no moving part, sucking the air downward. Such concepts of flying MHD disks have been developed in the peer review literature from the mid 1970s mainly by physicists Leik Myrabo with the Lightcraft, and Subrata Roy with the Wingless Electromagnetic Air Vehicle (WEAV).

These futuristic visions have been advertised in the media although they still remain beyond the reach of modern technology.

=== Spacecraft propulsion ===
A number of experimental methods of spacecraft propulsion are based on magnetohydrodynamics. As this kind of MHD propulsion involves compressible fluids in the form of plasmas (ionized gases) it is also referred to as magnetogasdynamics or magnetoplasmadynamics.

In such electromagnetic thrusters, the working fluid is most of the time ionized hydrazine, xenon or lithium. Depending on the propellant used, it can be seeded with alkali such as potassium or caesium to improve its electrical conductivity. All charged species within the plasma, from positive and negative ions to free electrons, as well as neutral atoms by the effect of collisions, are accelerated in the same direction by the Lorentz "body" force, which results from the combination of a magnetic field with an orthogonal electric field (hence the name of "cross-field accelerator"), these fields not being in the direction of the acceleration. This is a fundamental difference with ion thrusters which rely on electrostatics to accelerate only positive ions using the Coulomb force along a high voltage electric field.

First experimental studies involving cross-field plasma accelerators (square channels and rocket nozzles) date back to the late 1950s. Such systems provide greater thrust and higher specific impulse than conventional chemical rockets and even modern ion drives, at the cost of a higher required energy density.

Some devices also studied nowadays besides cross-field accelerators include the magnetoplasmadynamic thruster sometimes referred to as the Lorentz force accelerator (LFA), and the electrodeless pulsed inductive thruster (PIT).

Even today, these systems are not ready to be launched in space as they still lack a suitable compact power source offering enough energy density (such as hypothetical fusion reactors) to feed the power-greedy electromagnets, especially pulsed inductive ones. The rapid ablation of electrodes under the intense thermal flow is also a concern. For these reasons, studies remain largely theoretical and experiments are still conducted in the laboratory, although over 60 years have passed since the first research in this kind of thrusters.

== Fiction ==
Oregon, a ship in the Oregon Files series of books by author Clive Cussler, has a magnetohydrodynamic drive. This allows the ship to turn very sharply and brake instantly, instead of gliding for a few miles. In Valhalla Rising, Clive Cussler writes the same drive into the powering of Captain Nemo's Nautilus.

The film adaptation of The Hunt for Red October popularized the magnetohydrodynamic drive as a "caterpillar drive" for submarines, a nearly undetectable "silent drive" intended to achieve stealth in submarine warfare. In reality, the current traveling through the water would create gases and noise, and the magnetic fields would induce a detectable magnetic signature. In the film, it was suggested that this sound could be confused with geological activity. In the novel from which the film was adapted, the caterpillar that Red October used was actually a pump-jet of the so-called "tunnel drive" type (the tunnels provided acoustic camouflage for the cavitation from the propellers).

In the Ben Bova novel The Precipice, the ship where some of the action took place, Starpower 1, built to prove that exploration and mining of the asteroid belt was feasible and potentially profitable, had a magnetohydrodynamic drive mated to a fusion power plant.

== See also ==
- Electrohydrodynamics
- Lorentz force, relates electric and magnetic fields to propulsion force
