= Evgeny Velikhov =

Russian physicist (1935–2024)

- Евгений Велихов
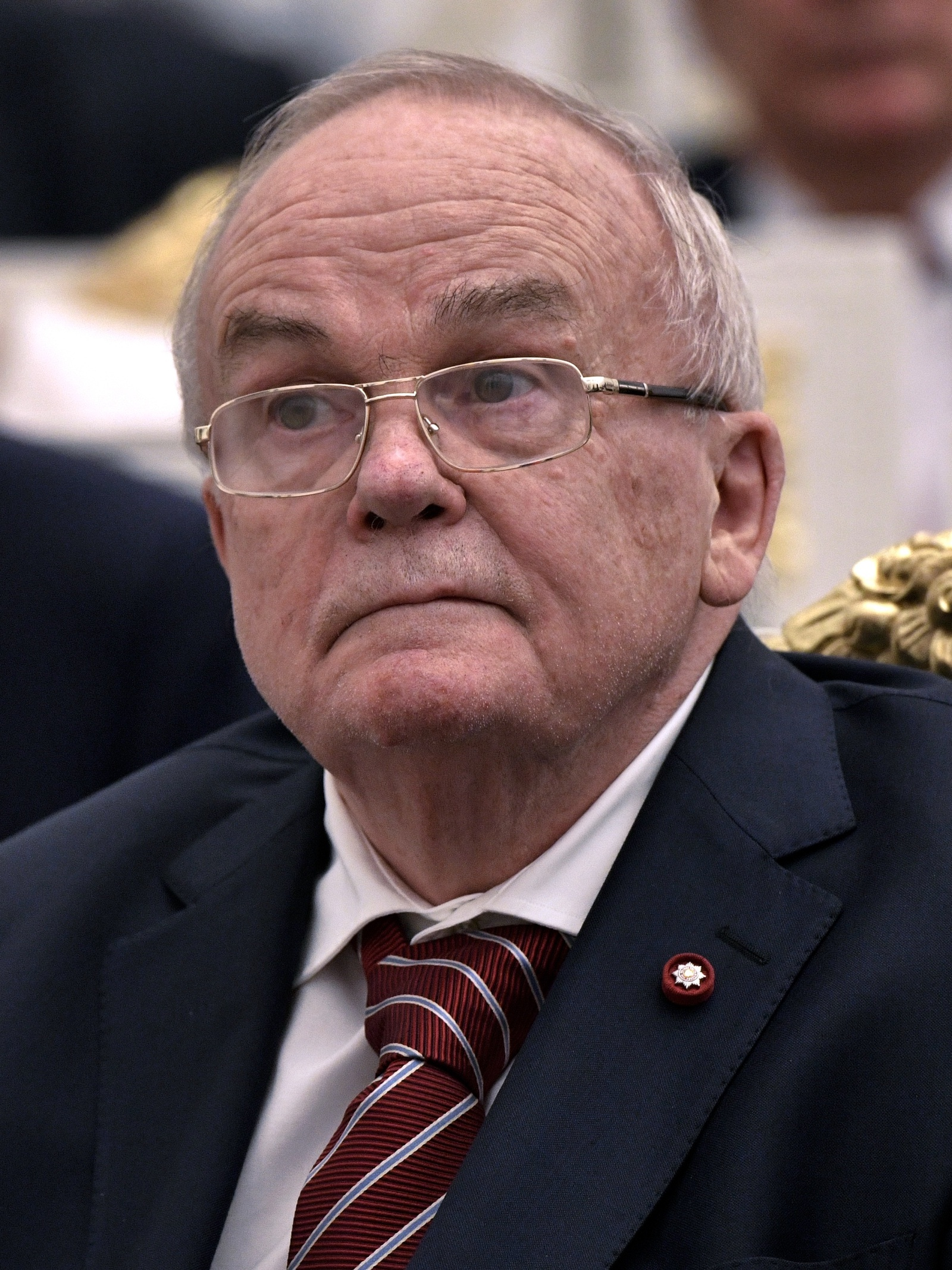
- Velikhov in 2017
- Born: 2 February 1935; Moscow, Russian SFSR, USSR
- Died: 5 December 2024 (aged 89)
- Citizenship: Soviet Union; Russia
- Education: M.V. Lomonosov Moscow State University
- Awards: Hero of Socialist Labour (1985); Lenin Prize (1984); State Prize of the Russian Federation (2003); Global Energy Prize (2006); Orders of Lenin; Order of Merit for the Fatherland; Order of Courage; Order of the Red Banner of Labour
- Scientific career
- Fields: Nuclear physics
- Workplaces: Kurchatov Institute; Russian Academy of Sciences; Soviet Academy of Sciences; Moscow Institute of Physics and Technology; Public Chamber of Russia
- Academic advisors: Alexander Prokhorov
- Evgeny Velikhov's voice Velikhov's on the Echo of Moscow program, 1 June 2006

Evgeny Pavlovich Velikhov (Russian: Евгений Павлович Велихов; 2 February 1935 – 5 December 2024) was a Russian physicist and scientific leader. His scientific interests included plasma physics, lasers, controlled nuclear fusion, power engineering, and magnetohydrodynamics (high-power pulsed MHD generators). He was the author of over 1500 scientific publications and a number of inventions and discoveries.

Velikhov held the post of president of the Kurchatov Institute (named after Igor Kurchatov) and first Secretary (head) of the Civic Chamber of the Russian Federation. He was a member of the Russian Academy of Sciences and the vice-president of the Academy of Sciences of the Soviet Union.

== Life and career ==
Evgeny Velikhov graduated from the Department of Physics at M.V. Lomonosov Moscow State University (MSU) in 1958, where he specialized in theoretical physics. From 1958 until 1961, he studied at graduate school. After completing his graduate work, he began work as a junior researcher at the Institute of Atomic Energy, the precursor institution to the Russian Research Centre (RRC) "Kurchatov Institute". He spent most of his scientific career rising through the ranks of this famous federal scientific agency.

His early work regarding fluid and plasma instabilities led to the discovery of the magnetorotational instability in 1959, and the electrothermal instability in 1962.

In 1964, he defended his thesis before receiving his Doctor of Science degree in physics and mathematics.

In 1968, he obtained the rank of Professor of atomic physics, plasma physics, and microelectronics at the Physics Department of Moscow State University. In 1973, he became the head of the Department until 1988. In 1971, he became a member of the Communist Party.

From 1971 to 1978, he was the director of the Magnetic Laboratory (later known as the TRINITY State Scientific Center), a branch of the Academy of Sciences of the Soviet Union in 1956, and subdivision of Kurchatov Institute since 1961, at Troitsk, Moscow Oblast.

In 1972, he founded an energy and space plasma research department at Moscow Institute of Physics and Technology (MIPT, more known as "Phystech"), with a base in this branch of the Kurchatov Institute of Atomic Energy (KIAE).

In 1975, he established another new department at Phystech in order to study the problems of physics and energy, for which he received the honor of chair of plasma energy. The next year, he was appointed the first dean of the Faculty of Physics For Energy (FPFE), a R&D department of fusion energy specialized in plasma and high pressure physics, quantum optics, laser, and space technologies. Ten years later, in 1986, he was promoted as the scientific director of FPFE. In 1986, he was also a science advisor to Mikhail Gorbachev and helped in the clean-up of the Chernobyl Disaster.

In 1988, he was named director of Kurchatov Institute and chairman of the international programme (Russia, United States, European Union and Japan) for the creation of the thermonuclear experimental tokamak ITER, and has been its president from 1992 until his death in December 2024. In 2009 he was elected Chair of the ITER Council, the governing body of ITER.

He was also president of the joint-stock company Rosshelf (Russian offshore development company to develop seafloor-based oil and gas production complex), Gazprom's subsidiary; and co-chairman of RELCOM board of directors.

Velikhov resided in Moscow until his death on 5 December 2024, at the age of 89.

== Awards ==
Evgeny Velikhov was well known in the world scientific and engineering community for his diverse activities, for which he has received several honors and awards, among which:

- Member of the US National Academy of Engineering (2003)
- Correspondent of the Academy of Sciences of the Soviet Union (1968); Member of the Academy of Sciences of the Soviet Union (1974); Vice-President of the Academy of Sciences of the Soviet Union (1978–1991) and the Russian Academy of Sciences (1991–1996).
- Academician-secretary of the Office of information technologies and computer engineering and automatics division of Russian Academy of Sciences (since 1983).
- Hero of Socialist Labour (1985); USSR State Prize laureate (1977); winner of the Lenin Prize (1984); the MD Millionshchikov Prize of USSR Academy of Sciences (1986); the State Prize of the Russian Federation (2003); the "Global Energy Prize" (2006); as well as the American Physical Society Szilard's Prize and the World Scientist Federation "Science and Peace" Prize.
- Hero of Labour of the Russian Federation (2020)
- Three Orders of Lenin
- Order "For Merit to the Fatherland", 1st (2015), 2nd (2005), 3rd (2000) and 4th (2010) class
- Order of Courage
- Order of the Red Banner of Labour
- Honorary member of the Royal Swedish Academy of Engineering Sciences.
- Honorary member of Ioffe Institute, Saint Petersburg.
- Doctor Honoris Causa at the University of Notre Dame, Indiana; at William Howard Taft University, California, USA; and at the University of London, UK.
- Honorary Citizen of Rino, USA; and Plovdiv, Bulgaria.
- Order of Merit 3rd Class (Ukraine, 26 April 2011) - for his significant personal contribution to overcoming the consequences of the Chernobyl disaster, the implementation of international humanitarian programs, many years of fruitful public activity.
- Order of the Rising Sun, 2nd class (Japan)
