= Troitsk Institute of Innovative and Thermonuclear Research =

Research institute in Troitsk, Russia

SSC RF "Troitsk Institute of Innovative and Thermonuclear Research" or TRINITY for short Russian: Троицкий Институт инновационных и термоядерных исследований, ГНЦ РФ ТРИНИТИ) is a Russian state scientific center (SSC) in the field of controlled thermonuclear fusion, plasma physics, laser physics, and the technology and practical application of impulse sources of power supply based on MHD generators.

It is located in Troitsk, Moscow. It was established in 1956 as the Magnetic Laboratory of the USSR Academy of Sciences by an initiative of the academician Anatoly Aleksandrov.

In 1961, it was merged into Kurchatov Institute as a special sector (later a section). Currently, its director is Professor V. E. Cherkovets. TRINITY was reestablished in 1991 receiving its current name. In 1994 it was granted the status of State Scientific Center (SSC), which was renewed in 1997, 2000, 2002, 2004, and 2007.

TRINITY operates the experimental facility Angara 5-1 and the thermonuclear complex SFT (Strong Field Tokamak T-11M).
