= Magnetohydrodynamic converter =

Electromagnetic machine with no moving parts

A magnetohydrodynamic converter (MHD converter) is an electromagnetic machine with no moving parts involving magnetohydrodynamics, the study of the kinetics of electrically conductive fluids (liquid or ionized gas) in the presence of electromagnetic fields. Such converters act on the fluid using the Lorentz force to operate in two possible ways: either as an electric generator called an MHD generator, extracting energy from a fluid in motion; or as an electric motor called an MHD accelerator or magnetohydrodynamic drive, putting a fluid in motion by injecting energy. MHD converters are indeed reversible, like many electromagnetic devices.

Michael Faraday first attempted to test a MHD converter in 1832. MHD converters involving plasmas were highly studied in the 1960s and 1970s, with many government funding and dedicated international conferences. One major conceptual application was the use of MHD converters on the hot exhaust gas in a coal fired power plant, where it could extract some of the energy with very high efficiency, and then pass it into a conventional steam turbine. The research almost stopped after it was considered the electrothermal instability would severely limit the efficiency of such converters when intense magnetic fields are used, although solutions may exist.

Crossed-field magnetohydrodynamic converters (linear Faraday type with segmented electrodes). A: MHD generator. B: MHD accelerator.

Crossed-field magnetohydrodynamic converters

(linear Faraday type with segmented electrodes)

A: MHD generator. B: MHD accelerator.

== MHD power generation ==
A magnetohydrodynamic generator is an MHD converter that transforms the kinetic energy of an electrically conductive fluid, in motion with respect to a steady magnetic field, into electricity. MHD power generation has been tested extensively in the 1960s with liquid metals and plasmas as working fluids.

Basically, a plasma is hurtling down within a channel whose walls are fitted with electrodes. Electromagnets create a uniform transverse magnetic field within the cavity of the channel. The Lorentz force then acts upon the trajectory of the incoming electrons and positive ions, separating the opposite charge carriers according to their sign. As negative and positive charges are spatially separated within the chamber, an electric potential difference can be retrieved across the electrodes. While work is extracted from the kinetic energy of the incoming high-velocity plasma, the fluid slows down during the process.

== MHD propulsion ==
A magnetohydrodynamic accelerator is an MHD converter that imparts motion to an electrically conductive fluid initially at rest, using cross electric current and magnetic field both applied within the fluid. MHD propulsion has been mostly tested with models of ships and submarines in seawater. Studies are also ongoing since the early 1960s about aerospace applications of MHD to aircraft propulsion and flow control to enable hypersonic flight: action on the boundary layer to prevent laminar flow from becoming turbulent, shock wave mitigation or cancellation for thermal control and reduction of the wave drag and form drag, inlet flow control and airflow velocity reduction with an MHD generator section ahead of a scramjet or turbojet to extend their regimes at higher Mach numbers, combined to an MHD accelerator in the exhaust nozzle fed by the MHD generator through a bypass system. Research on various designs are also conducted on electromagnetic plasma propulsion for space exploration.

In an MHD accelerator, the Lorentz force accelerates all charge carriers in the same direction whatever their sign, as well as neutral atoms and molecules of the fluid through collisions. The fluid is ejected toward the rear and as a reaction, the vehicle accelerates forward.

== See also ==
- Plasma (physics)
- Lorentz force
- Electrothermal instability
- Wingless Electromagnetic Air Vehicle
