= Electromagnetic pump =

Type of pump

An electromagnetic pump is a pump that moves liquid metal, molten salt, brine, or other electrically conductive liquid using electromagnetism.

A magnetic field is set at right angles to the direction the liquid moves in, and a current is passed through it. This causes an electromagnetic force that moves the liquid.

Applications include pumping molten solder in many wave soldering machines, pumping liquid-metal coolant, and magnetohydrodynamic drive.

== Working principle ==
Schematic of an electromagnetic pump

A magnetic field (b_{rc}) always exists around the current (I)-carrying conductor. When this current-carrying conductor is subjected to an external magnetic field (B_{ap}), the conductor experiences a force perpendicular to the direction of I and B_{ap}. This is because the magnetic field produced by the conductor and the applied magnetic field attempt to align with each other. A similar effect can be seen between two ordinary magnets.

This principle is used in an electromagnetic pump. The current is fed through a conducting liquid. Two permanent magnets are arranged to produce a magnetic field B_{ap} as shown in the figure. The supplied current has a current density (J) and the magnetic field associated with this current can be called "Reaction magnetic Field (b_{rc})". The two magnetic fields B_{ap} and b_{rc} attempt to align with each other. This causes mechanical motion of the fluid.

== Einstein–Szilard electromagnetic pump ==
Designed for the Einstein–Szilard electromagnetic refrigerator (not the pumpless Einstein refrigerator), it uses electromagnetic induction to move conductive liquid metal without electrodes, to compress a working gas, pentane. It is a liquid linear induction motor.

== See also ==
- Magnetic flow meter
- Magnetohydrodynamic drive

== Bibliography ==
- Baker, Richard S., Tessier, Manuel J. Handbook of Electromagnetic pump technology. 1987. osti 5041159. oclc 246618050.
