= Electrothermal instability =

The electrothermal instability (also known as ionization instability, non-equilibrium instability or Velikhov instability in the literature) is a magnetohydrodynamic (MHD) instability appearing in magnetized non-thermal plasmas used in MHD converters. It was first theoretically discovered in 1962 and experimentally measured into a MHD generator in 1963 by Evgeny Velikhov.

"This paper shows that it is possible to assert sufficiently specifically that the ionization instability is the number one problem for the utilization of a plasma with hot electrons."

— Dr. Evgeny Velikov, at the 7th International Conference on Ionization Phenomena in Gases, Belgrade, Yugoslavia (1965).

== Physical explanation and characteristics ==
Evolution of the electrothermal instability in a Faraday MHD converter. Electric current lines.

This instability is a turbulence of the electron gas in a non-equilibrium plasma (i.e. where the electron temperature T_{e} is greatly higher than the overall gas temperature T_{g}). It arises when a magnetic field powerful enough is applied in such a plasma, reaching a critical Hall parameter β_{cr}.

Locally, the number of electrons and their temperature fluctuate (electron density and thermal velocity) as the electric current and the electric field.

The Velikhov instability is a kind of ionization wave system, almost frozen in the two temperature gas. The reader can evidence such a stationary wave phenomenon just applying a transverse magnetic field with a permanent magnet on the low-pressure control gauge (Geissler tube) provided on vacuum pumps. In this little gas-discharge bulb a high voltage electric potential is applied between two electrodes which generates an electric glow discharge (pinkish for air) when the pressure has become low enough. When the transverse magnetic field is applied on the bulb, some oblique grooves appear in the plasma, typical of the electrothermal instability.

The electrothermal instability occurs extremely quickly, in a few microseconds. The plasma becomes non-homogeneous, transformed into alternating layers of high free electron and poor free electron densities. Visually the plasma appears stratified, as a "pile of plates".

=== Hall effect in plasmas ===
The Hall effect in ionized gases has nothing to do with the Hall effect in solids (where the Hall parameter is always very inferior to unity). In a plasma, the Hall parameter can take any value.

The Hall parameter β in a plasma is the ratio between the electron gyrofrequency Ω_{e} and the electron-heavy particles collision frequency ν:

$$\beta \, = \, \frac {\Omega_e}{\nu} \, = \, \frac {e\ B}{m_e\ \nu}$$

where

- e is the electron charge (1.6 × 10^{−19} coulomb)
- B is the magnetic field (in teslas)
- m_{e} is the electron mass (9 × 10^{−31} kg)

The Hall parameter value increases with the magnetic field strength.

Physically, when the Hall parameter is low, the trajectories of electrons between two encounters with heavy particles (neutral or ion) are almost linear. But if the Hall parameter is high, the electron movements are highly curved. The current density vector J is no more colinear with the electric field vector E. The two vectors J and E make the Hall angle θ which also gives the Hall parameter:

$$\beta \, = \, \tan \theta$$

=== Plasma conductivity and magnetic fields ===
In a non-equilibrium ionized gas with high Hall parameter, Ohm's law,

$$\mathbf{J} = \sigma \mathbf{E}$$
where σ is the electrical conductivity (in siemens per metre),

is a matrix, because the electrical conductivity σ is a matrix:

$$\sigma = \sigma_s \begin{Vmatrix} \dfrac{1}{1+\beta^2} & \dfrac{-\beta}{1+\beta^2} \\ \dfrac{\beta}{1+\beta^2} & \dfrac{1}{1+\beta^2} \end{Vmatrix}$$

σ_{S} is the scalar electrical conductivity:

$$\sigma_s = \frac {n_e\ e^2}{m_e\ \nu}$$

where n_{e} is the electron density (number of electrons per cubic meter).

The current density J has two components:

$$J_{\parallel} = \frac {n_e\ e^2}{m_e\ \nu} \ \frac {E}{1+\beta^2} \qquad \text{and} \qquad J_{\perp} = \frac {-n_e\ e^2}{m_e\ \nu} \ \frac {\beta\ E}{1+\beta^2}$$

Therefore,

$$J_{\perp} = J_{\parallel}\ \beta$$

The Hall effect makes electrons "crabwalk".

When the magnetic field B is high, the Hall parameter β is also high, and $\frac {1}{1+\beta^2} \ll 1$

Thus both conductivities

$\sigma_{\parallel} \approx \frac {\sigma_s}{\beta^2} \qquad \text{and} \qquad \sigma_{\perp} \approx \frac {\sigma_s}{\beta}$

become weak, therefore the electric current cannot flow in these areas. This explains why the electron current density is weak where the magnetic field is the strongest.

=== Critical Hall parameter ===
The electrothermal instability occurs in a plasma at a (T_{e} > T_{g}) regime when the Hall parameter is higher than a critical value β_{cr}.

We have

$$f = \frac{\left( \frac{\delta \mu}{\mu} \right)}{\left( \frac{\delta n_e}{n_e} \right)}$$

where μ is the electron mobility (in m^{2}/(V·s))

and

$$s = \frac{2\ k\ T_e^2}{E_i\; (T_e - T_g)} \times \frac {1}{1 + \dfrac{3}{2}\ \dfrac{k\; T_e}{E_i}}$$

where E_{i} is the ionization energy (in electron volts) and k the Boltzmann constant.

The growth rate of the instability is

$$g = \frac{\sigma\ E^2}{n_e\; \left( E_i + \frac{3}{2} k\; T_e \right)\; \left( 1 + \beta^2 \right)}\; (\beta - \beta_{cr})$$

And the critical Hall parameter is

$$\beta_{cr} = 1.935 f + 0.065 + s
~$$

The critical Hall parameter β_{cr} greatly varies according to the degree of ionization α :

$$\alpha = \frac{n_i}{n_n}$$

where n_{i} is the ion density and n_{n} the neutral density (in particles per cubic metre).

The electron-ion collision frequency ν_{ei} is much greater than the electron-neutral collision frequency ν_{en}.

Therefore, with a weak energy degree of ionization α, the electron-ion collision frequency ν_{ei} can equal the electron-neutral collision frequency ν_{en}.

- For a weakly ionized gas (non-Coulombian plasma, when ν_{ei} < ν_{en} ):
  $$\beta_{cr} \approx (s^2 + 2s)^{\frac{1}{2}}$$
- For a fully ionized gas (Coulombian plasma, when ν_{ei} > ν_{en} ):
  $$\beta_{cr} \approx (2 + s)$$

NB: The term "fully ionized gas", introduced by Lyman Spitzer, does not mean the degree of ionization is unity, but only that the plasma is Coulomb-collision dominated, which can correspond to a degree of ionization as low as 0.01%.

== Technical problems and solutions ==
A two-temperature gas, globally cool but with hot electrons (T_{e} >> T_{g}) is a key feature for practical MHD converters, because it allows the gas to reach sufficient electrical conductivity while protecting materials from thermal ablation. This idea was first introduced for MHD generators in the early 1960s by Jack L. Kerrebrock and Alexander E. Sheindlin.

But the unexpected large and quick drop of current density due to electrothermal instability ruined many MHD projects worldwide, while previous calculations had envisaged energy conversion efficiencies over 60% with these devices. Although some studies were made into the instability by various researchers,no real solution was found at that time. This prevented further developments of non-equilibrium MHD generators and caused most engaged countries to cancel their MHD power plant programs and to retire completely from this field of research in the early 1970s, because this technical problem was then considered to be an impassable stumbling block.

Nevertheless, experimental studies about the growth rate of the electrothermal instability and the critical conditions showed that a stability region still exists for high electron temperatures. The stability is gained by a quick transition to "fully ionized" conditions (fast enough to overtake the growth rate of the electrothermal instability) where the Hall parameter decreases because of the collision frequency rising, below its critical value which is then about 2. Stable operation with several megawatts of power output had been experimentally achieved as from 1967 with high electron temperature. But this electrothermal control cannot provide an adequate decrease of T_{g} over long durations (to avoid thermal ablation), so such a solution is not practical for industrial energy conversion.

Another idea to control the instability is to increase the non-thermal ionisation rate by using a laser which would act like a guidance system for streamers between electrodes, increasing the electron density and the conductivity, therefore lowering the Hall parameter to below its critical value along these paths. But this concept has never been tested experimentally.

In the 1970s and more recently, some researchers tried to master the instability with oscillating fields. Oscillations of the electric field or of an additional RF electromagnetic field locally modify the Hall parameter.

Finally, a solution has been found in the early 1980s to completely remove the electrothermal instability within MHD converters, by means of non-homogeneous magnetic fields. A strong magnetic field implies a high Hall parameter, and therefore a low electrical conductivity in the medium. So the idea is to create some "paths" linking one electrode to the other, where the magnetic field is locally attenuated. Then the electric current tends to flow in these low B-field paths as thin plasma cords or streamers, where the electron density and temperature increase. The plasma becomes locally Coulombian, and the local Hall parameter value falls, while its critical threshold rises. Experiments where streamers do not present any inhomogeneity have been obtained with this method. This effect, strongly nonlinear, was unexpected but led to a very effective system for streamer guidance.

But this last working solution was discovered too late, 10 years after all the international effort about MHD power generation had been abandoned in most nations. Vladimir S. Golubev, coworker of Evgeny Velikhov, who met Jean-Pierre Petit in 1983 at the 9th MHD International conference in Moscow, made the following comment to the inventor of the magnetic stabilization method:

You bring the cure, but the patient already died...

However, this electrothermal stabilization by magnetic confinement, although found too late for the development of MHD power plants, might be of interest for future applications of MHD to aerodynamics (magnetoplasma-aerodynamics for hypersonic flight).

== See also ==
- Magnetohydrodynamics
- MHD generator
- Evgeny Velikhov
