= Vibrational energy relaxation =

Vibrational energy relaxation, or vibrational population relaxation, is a process in which the population distribution of molecules in quantum states of high energy level caused by an external perturbation returns to the Maxwell–Boltzmann distribution.

In solution, the process proceeds with intra- and intermolecular energy transfer. The excess energy of the excited vibrational mode is transferred to the kinetic modes in the same molecule or to the surrounding molecules. Through this process, the initially excited vibrational mode moves to a vibrational state of a lower energy. The relaxation is called the longitudinal relaxation, and the time constant of the relaxation is called the longitudinal relaxation time, or T_{1}.

Vibrational energy relaxation has been studied with time-resolved spectroscopy. By the excitation of the pump pulse, the population distribution of the vibrationally excited state is made by infrared absorption or a Raman process when the molecule is in the electronic ground state. In addition, by the electronic transition, the molecule often moves to the vibrationally excited state of the electronic excited state. The process of the energy relaxation from these vibrationally excited states can be observed with the probe pulse, which is delayed from the pump pulse.
