= Plasma recombination =

Phase transition from plasma to gas

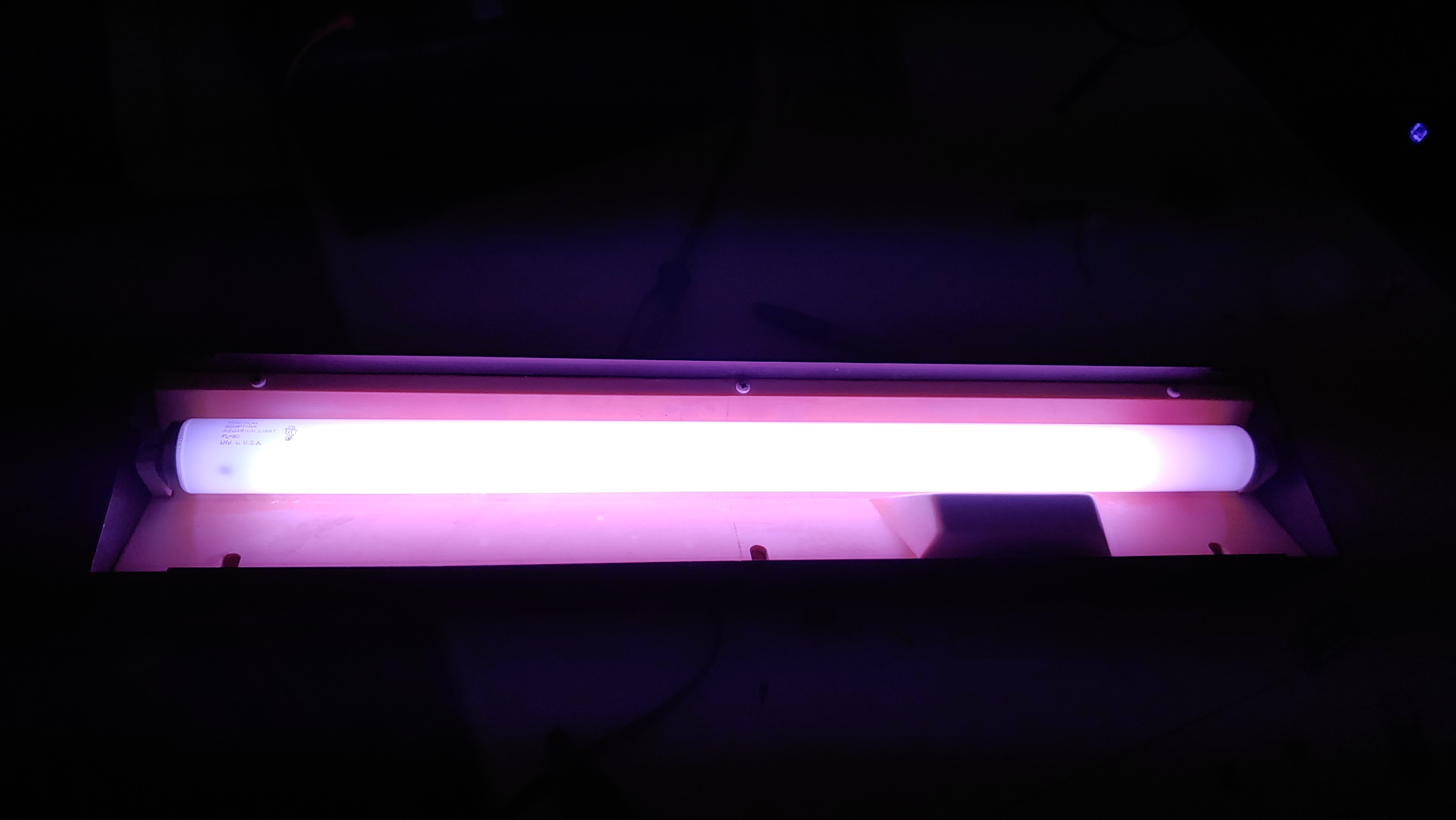
One example of plasma recombination is observed on the stoppage of electric current in a fluorescent lamp.

Plasma recombination is a process by which positive ions of a plasma capture a free (energetic) electron and combine with electrons or negative ions to form new neutral atoms (gas). The process of recombination can be described as the reverse of ionization, whereby conditions allow the plasma to evert to a gas. Recombination is an exothermic process, meaning that the plasma releases some of its internal energy, usually in the form of heat. Except for plasma composed of pure hydrogen (or its isotopes), there may also be multiply charged ions. Therefore, a single electron capture results in decrease of the ion charge, but not necessarily in a neutral atom or molecule.

Recombination usually takes place in the whole volume of a plasma (volume recombination), although in some cases it is confined to some region of the volume. Each kind of reaction is called a recombining mode and their individual rates are strongly affected by the properties of the plasma such as its energy (heat), density of each species, pressure and temperature of the surrounding environment.

== Examples ==
An everyday example of rapid plasma recombination occurs when a fluorescent lamp is switched off. The low-density plasma in the lamp (which generates the light by bombardment of the fluorescent coating on the inside of the glass wall) recombines in a fraction of a second after the plasma-generating electric field is removed by switching off the electric power source.

Hydrogen recombination modes are of vital importance in the development of divertor regions for tokamak reactors. In fact they will provide a good way for extracting the energy produced in the core of the plasma. At the present time, it is believed that the most likely plasma losses observed in the recombining region are due to two different modes: electron ion recombination (EIR) and molecular activated recombination (MAR).

== Table ==
Phase transitions of matter
To From	Solid	Liquid	Gas	Plasma
Solid		Melting	Sublimation	
Liquid	Freezing		Vaporization	
Gas	Deposition	Condensation		Ionization
Plasma			Recombination	
