= Degree of ionization =

Fraction of charged particles in a gas or an aqueous solution

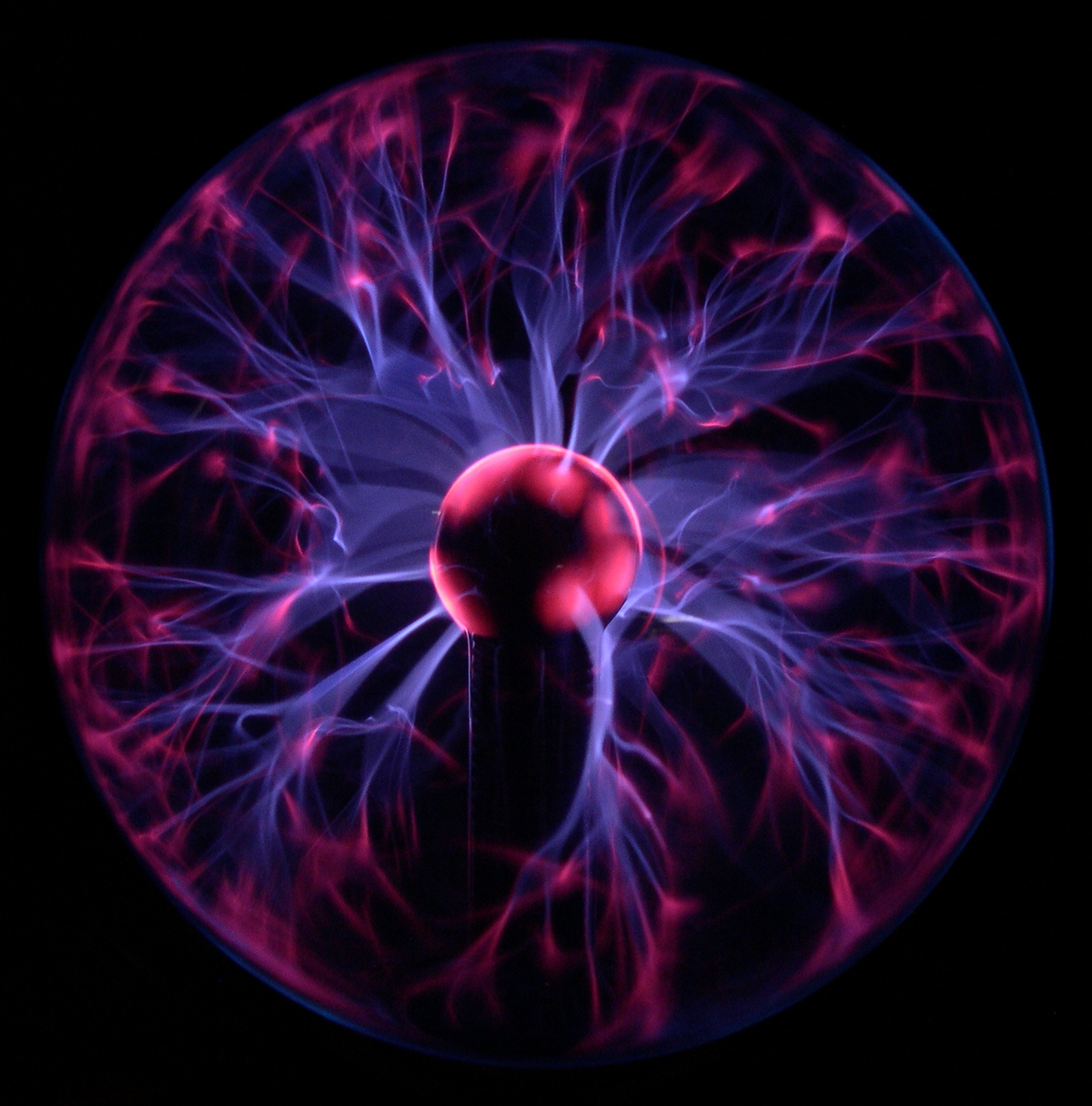
A plasma lamp, illustrating a low degree of ionization (i.e. a partially ionized gas)

The degree of ionization (also known as ionization yield in the literature) refers to the proportion of neutral particles, such as those in a gas or aqueous solution, that are ionized. For electrolytes, it could be understood as a capacity of acid/base to ionize itself. A low degree of ionization is sometimes called partially ionized (also weakly ionized), and a high degree of ionization as fully ionized. However, the term fully ionized is also used to describe an ion that has no electrons left.

Ionization refers to the process whereby an atom or molecule loses one or several electrons from its atomic orbital, or conversely gains an additional one, from an incoming free electron (electron attachment). In both cases, the atom or molecule ceases to be a neutral particle and becomes a charge carrier. If the species has lost one or several electrons, it becomes positively charged and is called a positive ion, or cation. On the contrary, if the species has gained one or several additional electrons, it becomes negatively charged and is called a negative ion, or anion. Individual free electrons and ions in a plasma have very short lives typically inferior to the microsecond, as ionization and recombination, excitation and relaxation are collective continuous processes.

== Chemistry usage ==
The degree of dissociation α (also known as degree of ionization), is a way of representing the strength of an acid. It is defined as the ratio of the number of ionized molecules and the number of molecules dissolved in water. It can be represented as a decimal number or as a percentage. One can classify strong acids as those having ionization degrees above 30%, weak acids as those with α below 30%, and the rest as moderate acids, at a specified molar concentration.

== Physics usage ==
In plasma physics, the degree of ionization α refers to the proportion of neutral particles that are ionized:

α = n_{i}/(n_{i} + n_{n})

where n_{i} is the ion density and n_{n} the neutral density (in particles per cubic meter). It is a dimensionless number, sometimes expressed as a percentage.

The terms fractional ionization and ionization fraction are also used to describe either the proportion of neutral particles that are ionized or the proportion of free electrons.

When referred to an atom, "fully ionized" means that there are no bound electrons left, resulting in a bare nucleus. A particular case of fully ionized gases are very hot thermonuclear plasmas, such as plasmas artificially produced in nuclear explosions or naturally formed in the Sun and all stars in the universe. Regular stars largely contain hydrogen and helium that are fully ionized into protons ( H^{+}) and alpha-particles (He^{2+}).

== History ==
Ionized matter was first identified in a discharge tube, or Crookes tube, and so described by Sir William Crookes in 1879 (he called it "radiant matter"). The nature of the Crookes tube "cathode ray" matter was subsequently identified by English physicist Sir J.J. Thomson in 1897, and dubbed "plasma" by Irving Langmuir in 1928, perhaps because it reminded him of a blood plasma.
