= List of plasma physics articles =

This is a list of plasma physics topics.

== A ==
- Ablation
- Abradable coating
- Abraham–Lorentz force
- Absorption band
- Accretion disk
- Active galactic nucleus
- Adiabatic invariant
- ADITYA (tokamak)
- Aeronomy
- Afterglow plasma
- Airglow
- Air plasma, Corona treatment, Atmospheric-pressure plasma treatment
- Ayaks, Novel "Magneto-plasmo-chemical engine"
- Alcator C-Mod
- Alfvén wave
- Ambipolar diffusion
- Aneutronic fusion
- Anisothermal plasma
- Anisotropy
- Antiproton Decelerator
- Appleton–Hartree equation
- Arcing horns
- Arc lamp
- Arc suppression
- ASDEX Upgrade, Axially Symmetric Divertor EXperiment
- Astron (fusion reactor)
- Astronomy
- Astrophysical plasma
- Astrophysical X-ray source
- Atmospheric dynamo
- Atmospheric escape
- Atmospheric pressure discharge
- Atmospheric-pressure plasma
- Atom
- Atomic emission spectroscopy
- Atomic physics
- Atomic-terrace low-angle shadowing
- Auger electron spectroscopy
- Aurora (astronomy)

== B ==
- Babcock Model
- Ball lightning
- Ball-pen probe
- Ballooning instability
- Baryon acoustic oscillations
- Beam-powered propulsion
- Beta (plasma physics)
- Birkeland current
- Blacklight Power
- Blazar
- Bohm diffusion
- Bohr–van Leeuwen theorem
- Boltzmann relation
- Bow shock
- Bremsstrahlung
- Bussard ramjet

== C ==
- Capacitively coupled plasma
- Carbon nanotube metal matrix composites
- Cassini–Huygens, Cassini Plasma Spectrometer
- Cathode ray
- Cathodic arc deposition
- Ceramic discharge metal-halide lamp
- Charge carrier
- Charged-device model
- Charged particle
- Chemical plasma
- Chemical vapor deposition
- Chemical vapor deposition of diamond
- Chirikov criterion
- Chirped pulse amplification
- Chromatography detector
- Chromo–Weibel instability
- Classical-map hypernetted-chain method
- Cnoidal wave
- Colored-particle-in-cell
- Coilgun
- Cold plasma, Ozone generator
- Collisionality
- Colored-particle-in-cell
- Columbia Non-neutral Torus
- Comet tail
- Compact toroid
- Compressibility
- Compton–Getting effect
- Contact lithography
- Coupling (physics)
- Convection cell
- Cooling flow
- Corona
- Corona discharge
- Corona ring
- Coronal loop
- Coronal radiative losses
- Coronal seismology
- Cosmic microwave background radiation
- Cotton–Mouton effect
- Coulomb collision
- Coulomb explosion
- Columbia Non-neutral Torus
- Crackle tube
- Critical ionization velocity
- Crookes tube
- Current sheet
- Cutoff frequency
- Cyclotron radiation

== D ==
- Debye length
- Debye sheath
- Deep reactive-ion etching
- Degenerate matter
- Degree of ionization
- DEMO, DEMOnstration Power Plant
- Dense plasma focus
- Dielectric barrier discharge
- Diffusion damping
- DIII-D (tokamak)
- Dimensional analysis
- Diocotron instability
- Direct-current discharge
- Directed-energy weapon
- Direct bonding
- distribution function
- Divertor
- Doppler broadening
- Doppler effect
- Double layer (plasma)
- Dual segmented Langmuir probe, Non-Maxwellian Features in Ionospheric Plasma
- Duoplasmatron
- Dusty plasma
- Dynamo theory

== E ==
- Earth's magnetic field
- Experimental Advanced Superconducting Tokamak (EAST)
- Ectons
- Eddington luminosity
- Edge-localized mode
- Ekman number
- Elastic collision
- Electrical breakdown
- Electrical conductor
- Electrical mobility
- Electrical resistance and conductance
- Electrical resistivity and conductivity
- Electrical treeing
- Electrically powered spacecraft propulsion
- Electric-field screening
- Electric arc
- Electric arc furnace, Plasma arc furnace
- Electric current
- Electric discharge
- Electric spark
- Electric Tokamak
- Electrothermal-chemical technology, uses plasma cartridge, Triple coaxial plasma igniter
- Electrodeless plasma excitation
- Electrodeless plasma thruster
- Electrodynamic tether, Flowing Plasma Effect
- Electrohydrodynamic thruster
- Electrolaser, Laser-Induced Plasma Channel
- Electromagnetic electron wave
- Electromagnetic field
- Electromagnetic pulse
- Electromagnetic spectrum
- Electron-cloud effect
- Electron
- Electron avalanche
- Electron beam ion trap
- Electron cyclotron resonance
- Electron density
- Electron energy loss spectroscopy
- Electron gun
- Electron microprobe
- Electron spiral toroid
- Electron temperature
- Electronvolt
- Electron wake
- Electrostatic discharge
- Electrostatic ion cyclotron wave
- Electrostatic ion thruster
- Electrosurgery
- Electrothermal instability
- Electroweak epoch
- Elemental analysis
- Elliptic flow
- Emission spectrum
- Energetic neutral atom
- Energy density
- Energy filtered transmission electron microscopy
- Evanescent wave
- Evershed effect
- Excimer lamp
- Excimer laser
- Extraordinary optical transmission
- Extreme ultraviolet
- Extreme ultraviolet lithography

== F ==
- Failure analysis
- FalconSAT
- Faraday cup
- Faraday effect, Faraday rotation in the ionosphere
- Far-infrared laser
- Farley-Buneman instability
- Fast Auroral Snapshot Explorer
- Ferritic nitrocarburizing, Plasma-assisted ferritic nitrocarburizing, plasma ion nitriding
- Ferrofluid
- Field line
- Field-reversed configuration
- Filament propagation
- Finite-difference time-domain method
- Fire
- Fisher's equation
- Fission fragment reactor
- Fission-fragment rocket, Dusty Plasma Based Fission Fragment Nuclear Reactor
- Flame plasma
- Flare spray
- Flashtube
- Flatness problem
- Flowing-afterglow mass spectrometry
- Fluid dynamics
- Fluorescent lamp
- Forbidden mechanism
- Force-free magnetic field
- Free-electron laser
- Free electron model
- F region, Appleton layer
- Frequency classification of plasmas
- Fusion energy gain factor
- Fusion power
- fusion torch
- fusor

== G ==
- Galactic corona
- Galactic halo
- Gas
- Gas-filled tube
- Gas core reactor rocket
- Gas cracker, plasma cracking
- Gas Electron Multiplier
- Gaseous fission reactor
- Gaseous ionisation detectors
- Gas focusing
- Gasification, Plasma gasifier
- Geissler tube
- General Fusion
- Geomagnetic storm
- Geothermal Anywhere
- Glasser effect
- Glass frit bonding
- Glow discharge
- Glow-discharge optical emission spectroscopy (GDOES)
- Grad–Shafranov equation
- Granule (solar physics)
- Great Rift (astronomy)
- GreenSun Energy
- Guiding center
- Gunn–Peterson trough
- GYRO
- Gyrokinetic ElectroMagnetic
- Gyrokinetics
- Gyroradius
- Gyrotron

== H ==
- Hadronization
- Hagedorn temperature, Transition to Quark-Gluon Plasma
- Hall effect
- Hall-effect thruster
- Hasegawa–Mima equation
- Heat shield
- Heat torch
- Helically Symmetric Experiment
- Helicon double-layer thruster
- Helicon (physics)
- Heliosphere
- Heliospheric current sheet
- Helium
- Helium line ratio
- Helmet streamer
- Hessdalen light
- High beta fusion reactor
- High-energy nuclear physics
- High-frequency Active Auroral Research Program
- High harmonic generation
- High-intensity discharge lamp
- High Power Impulse Magnetron Sputtering
- High voltage
- HiPER, High-Power laser Energy Research facility
- Hiss (electromagnetic), Plasmaspheric hiss
- Hollow cathode effect
- Hollow-cathode lamp
- Holtsmark distribution
- Homopolar generator
- Horizon problem
- Hydrogen
- Hydrogen sensor
- Hypernova
- Hypersonic speed
- Hypersonic wind tunnel
- Hypervelocity
- Hypertherm

== I ==
- IEEE Nuclear and Plasma Sciences Society
- IGNITOR
- IMAGE, Imager for Magnetopause-to-Aurora Global Exploration, Radio Plasma Imager
- Impalefection
- Impulse generator
- Incoherent scatter
- Induction plasma technology
- Inductively coupled plasma
- Inductively coupled plasma atomic emission spectroscopy
- Inductively coupled plasma mass spectrometry
- Inelastic mean free path
- inertial confinement fusion
- Inertial electrostatic confinement
- Inertial fusion power plant
- Instability
- Insulated-gate bipolar transistor
- Insulator (electrical)
- Interbol
- Intergalactic medium
- International Reference Ionosphere
- Interplanetary magnetic field
- Interplanetary medium
- Interplanetary scintillation
- Interstellar medium
- Interstellar nebula
- Interstellar travel
- Intracluster medium
- Io-Jupiter flux tube
- Ion
- Ionized-air glow
- Ion acoustic wave
- Ion beam
- Ion-beam shepherd
- Ion cyclotron resonance
- Ion gun
- Ion laser
- Ion optics
- Ion plating
- Ion source
- Ion wind
- Ionosphere
- Ionospheric heater
- Ionospheric propagation
- Isotope-ratio mass spectrometry, Multiple collector – inductively coupled plasma – mass spectrometry (MC-ICP-MS)
- ITER, International Thermonuclear Experimental Reactor

== J ==
- Jellium, uniform electron gas, homogeneous electron gas
- Jet (particle physics)
- Jet quenching
- Joint European Torus

== K ==
- Kennelly–Heaviside layer, E region
- Kinetics (physics)
- Kink instability
- Kirchhoff's circuit laws
- Kite applications, plasma kite
- Kosterlitz–Thouless transition
- KSTAR, Korea Superconducting Tokamak Advanced Research
- Kværner-process, Plasma burner, Plasma variation

== L ==
- Lagrange point colonization
- Landau damping
- Langmuir probe
- Large Hadron Collider
- Large Helical Device
- Large Plasma Device
- Laser-hybrid welding
- Laser-induced breakdown spectroscopy, Laser Induced Plasma Spectroscopy
- Laser-induced fluorescence
- Laser ablation
- Laser ablation synthesis in solution
- Laser plasma acceleration
- Lawson criterion
- Lerche–Newberger sum rule
- Le Sage's theory of gravitation
- Levitated dipole
- LIDAR
- Lightcraft
- Lightning
- LINUS (Fusion Experiment)
- List of hydrodynamic instabilities
- List of plasma physicists
- LOFAR, Low Frequency Array
- Longitudinal wave
- Lorentz force
- Low-energy electron diffraction
- Lower hybrid oscillation
- Low-pressure discharge
- Luminescent solar concentrator
- Lundquist number
- Luttinger liquid

== M ==
- Madison Symmetric Torus
- MagBeam, also called Magnetized beamed plasma propulsion, plasma wind
- Magnetic bottle
- Magnetic braking
- Magnetic cloud
- Magnetic confinement fusion
- Magnetic diffusivity
- Magnetic field
- Magnetic field oscillating amplified thruster, Plasma Engine
- Magnetic helicity
- Magnetic mirror
- Magnetic Prandtl number
- Magnetic pressure
- Magnetic proton recoil neutron spectrometer
- Magnetic radiation reaction force
- Magnetic reconnection
- Magnetic Reynolds number
- Magnetic sail, Mini-magnetospheric plasma propulsion
- Magnetic tail
- Magnetic tension force
- Magnetic weapon
- Magnetization reversal by circularly polarized light
- Magnetized target fusion
- Magnetogravity wave
- Magnetohydrodynamic drive
- MHD generator
- Magnetohydrodynamics
- Magnetohydrodynamic turbulence
- Magneto-optical trap
- Magnetopause
- Magnetoplasmadynamic thruster
- Magnetosheath
- Magnetosonic wave, also magnetoacoustic wave
- Magnetosphere
- Magnetosphere chronology
- Magnetosphere of Saturn, Sources and transport of plasma
- Magnetosphere particle motion
- Magnetospheric Multiscale Mission
- Magnetotellurics
- MAGPIE, stands for Mega Ampere Generator for Plasma Implosion Experiments, Marx generator
- MARAUDER, acronym of Magnetically Accelerated Ring to Achieve Ultra-high Directed Energy and Radiation
- Marchywka Effect
- Marfa lights
- Many-body problem
- Mars Express
- Mass driver, or electromagnetic catapult
- Mass spectrometry
- Material point method
- Maxwell–Boltzmann distribution
- Maxwell's equations
- Mechanically Stimulated Gas Emission
- Mega Ampere Spherical Tokamak
- Metallic bond
- Metallizing
- Metamaterial antenna
- Microplasma
- Microstructured optical arrays
- Microturbulence
- Microwave digestion
- Microwave discharge
- Microwave plasma-assisted CVD
- Microwave plasma
- Migma
- MIT Plasma Science and Fusion Center
- Moreton wave
- Multipactor effect

== N ==
- Nanoflares
- Nanoparticle
- Nanoscale plasmonic motor
- Nanoshell
- National Compact Stellarator Experiment
- National Spherical Torus Experiment
- Navier–Stokes equations
- Negative index metamaterials
- Negative resistance
- Negative temperature
- Neon lighting
- Neon sign
- Neutral beam injection
- Neutron generator
- Neutron source
- Neutron star spin-up
- New Horizons, Plasma and high energy particle spectrometer suite (PAM)
- Nitrogen–phosphorus detector
- Nonequilibrium Gas and Plasma Dynamics Laboratory
- Non-line-of-sight propagation
- Non-thermal microwave effect
- Nonthermal plasma, Cold plasma
- Nuclear fusion, Bremsstrahlung losses in quasineutral, isotropic plasmas, deuterium plasma
- Nuclear pulse propulsion
- Nuclear pumped laser
- Numerical diffusion
- Numerical resistivity

== O ==
- Ohmic contact
- Onset of deconfinement
- Optode
- Optoelectric nuclear battery
- Orbitrap
- Outer space

== P ==
- Particle-in-cell
- Particle accelerator
- Paschen's law
- Peek's law
- Pegasus Toroidal Experiment
- Penning mixture
- Penrose criterion
- Perhapsatron
- Phased plasma gun
- Photon
- Photonic metamaterial
- Photonics
- Physical cosmology
- Physical vapor deposition
- Piezoelectric direct discharge plasma
- Pinch (plasma physics)
- Planetary nebula
- Planetary nebula luminosity function
- Plasma-desorption mass spectrometry
- Plasma-enhanced chemical vapor deposition
- Plasma-immersion ion implantation
- Plasma (physics)
- Plasma acceleration
- Plasma Acoustic Shield System
- Plasma activated bonding
- Plasma activation
- Plasma actuator
- Plasma antenna
- Plasma arc waste disposal, Incineration
- Plasma arc welding
- Plasma channel
- Plasma chemistry
- Plasma cleaning
- Plasma Contactor
- Plasma containment
- Plasma conversion
- Plasma cosmology, ambiplasma
- Plasma cutting, Plasma gouging
- Plasma deep drilling technology
- Plasma diagnostics, Self Excited Electron Plasma Resonance Spectroscopy (SEERS)
- Plasma display
- Plasma effect
- Plasma electrolytic oxidation
- Plasma etcher
- Plasma etching
- Plasma frequency
- Plasma functionalization
- Plasma globe
- Plasma lamp
- Plasma medicine
- Plasma modeling
- Plasma nitriding
- Plasma oscillation
- Plasma parameter
- Plasma parameters
- Plasma pencil
- Plasma polymerization
- Plasma processing
- Plasma propulsion engine
- Plasma Pyrolysis Waste Treatment and Disposal
- Plasma receiver
- Plasma scaling
- Plasma shaping
- Plasma sheet
- Plasma shield, Plasma window
- Plasma sound source
- Plasma source
- Plasma speaker
- Plasma spray
- Plasma spraying, Thermal spraying, Surface finishing
- Plasma stability
- Plasma stealth
- Plasma torch
- Plasma transferred wire arc thermal spraying
- Plasma valve
- Plasma weapon
- Plasma weapon (fiction)
- Plasma window, Force field
- Plasmadynamics and Electric Propulsion Laboratory
- Plasmaphone
- Plasmapper
- Plasmaron
- Plasmasphere
- Plasmoid
- Plasmon
- Plasmonic cover, Theories of cloaking
- Plasmonic laser, Nanolaser
- Plasmonic metamaterials
- Plasmonic nanolithography
- Plasmonic Nanoparticles
- Plasmonic solar cell
- Polarization density
- Polarization ripples
- Polar (satellite)
- Polymeric surfaces
- Polywell
- Ponderomotive force
- Princeton field-reversed configuration experiment
- Propulsive Fluid Accumulator, nuclear-powered magnetohydrodynamic electromagnetic plasma thruster
- Proton beam
- Pseudospark switch
- Pulsed Energy Projectile
- Pulsed laser deposition, Dynamic of the plasma
- Pulsed plasma thruster, also Plasma Jet Engines

== Q ==
- Q-machine
- QCD matter
- Quadrupole ion trap
- Quantum cascade laser
- Quark–gluon plasma
- Quarkonium
- Quasar
- Quasiparticle

== R ==
- Radiation
- Radiation damage
- Radical polymerization
- Radioactive waste
- Radio atmospheric
- Radio galaxy
- Radio halo
- Radio relics
- Railgun
- Radio Aurora Explorer (RAX)
- Random phase approximation
- Ray tracing (physics)
- Reactive-ion etching
- Reaction engine
- Rectifier, Plasma type
- Refractive index
- Reionization
- Relativistic beaming
- Relativistic jet
- Relativistic particle
- Relativistic plasma
- Relativistic similarity parameter
- Remote plasma-enhanced CVD
- Resistive ballooning mode
- Resolved sideband cooling
- Resonant magnetic perturbations
- Resonator mode
- Reversed field pinch
- Richtmyer–Meshkov instability
- Riggatron
- Ring current
- Rocket engine nozzle
- Runaway breakdown
- Rydberg atom
- Rydberg matter

== S ==
- Safety factor (plasma physics)
- Saha ionization equation
- Sceptre (fusion reactor)
- Scramjet
- Screened Poisson equation
- SEAgel, Safe Emulsion Agar gel
- Selected-ion flow-tube mass spectrometry
- Self-focusing
- Sensitive high-resolution ion microprobe
- Shielding gas
- Shiva laser
- Shiva Star
- Shock diamond
- Shocks and discontinuities (magnetohydrodynamics)
- Shock wave, Oblique shock
- Skin effect
- Skip zone
- Sky brightness
- Skywave
- Slapper detonator
- Small Tight Aspect Ratio Tokamak
- Solar cycle, Cosmic ray flux
- Solar flare
- Solar Orbiter, Radio and Plasma Wave analyser
- Solar prominence
- Solar transition region
- Solar wind
- Solar wind turbulence
- Solenoid
- Solution precursor plasma spray, Plasma plume
- Sonoluminescence
- South Atlantic Anomaly
- Southern Hemisphere Auroral Radar Experiment
- Space physics
- Spacequake
- Space Shuttle
- Space Shuttle thermal protection system
- Space tether missions
- Spark-gap transmitter
- Spark plasma sintering
- Spaser
- Spectral imaging
- Spectral line
- Spherical tokamak
- Spheromak
- Spinplasmonics
- Spontaneous emission
- Spreeta
- Sprite (lightning)
- Sputter cleaning
- Sputter deposition
- Sputtering
- SSIES, Special Sensors-Ions, Electrons, and Scintillation thermal plasma analysis package
- SST-1 (tokamak), Steady State Tokamak
- Star
- Star lifting
- State of matter
- Static forces and virtual-particle exchange
- Stellarator
- Stellar-wind bubble
- St. Elmo's fire
- Strahl (astronomy)
- Strangeness production
- Strontium vapor laser
- Structure formation
- Sudden ionospheric disturbance
- Sun
- SUNIST, Sino-UNIted Spherical Tokamak, Alfven wave current drive experiments in spherical tokamak plasmas
- Superlens, Plasmon-assisted microscopy
- Supernova
- Supernova remnants
- Sura Ionospheric Heating Facility
- Surface-wave-sustained mode
- Surface enhanced Raman spectroscopy
- Surface plasmon
- Surface plasmon polaritons
- Surface plasmon resonance
- Suspension plasma spray
- Synchrotron light source

== T ==
- Taylor state
- Teller–Ulam design, Foam plasma pressure
- Tesla coil
- Test particle, in plasma physics or electrodynamics
- Thermal barrier coating
- Thermalisation
- Thermionic converter
- Thermodynamic temperature
- Thomson scattering
- Thunder
- Tokamak
- Tokamak à configuration variable
- Tokamak Fusion Test Reactor
- Toroidal ring model
- Townsend discharge
- Townsend (unit)
- Transformation optics
- Transmission medium
- Trisops, Force Free Plasma Vortices
- Tunable diode laser absorption spectroscopy
- Tweeter, Plasma or Ion tweeter
- Two-dimensional guiding-center plasma
- Two-dimensional point vortex gas
- Two-stream instability

== U ==
- U-HID, Ultra High Intensity Discharge
- UMIST linear system
- Undulator
- Upper hybrid oscillation
- Upper-atmospheric lightning

== V ==
- Vacuum arc, thermionic vacuum arc generates a pure metal and ceramic vapour plasma
- Van Allen radiation belt
- Vapor–liquid–solid method
- Variable Specific Impulse Magnetoplasma Rocket
- Vector inversion generator
- Versatile Toroidal Facility
- Violet wand
- Virial theorem
- Vlasov equation
- Volatilisation
- VORPAL, Versatile Object-oriented Relativistic Plasma Analysis with Lasers
- Voyager program, Plasma Wave Subsystem

== W ==
- Warm dense matter
- Wave equation
- Waves in plasmas
- Wave turbulence
- Weibel instability
- Wendelstein 7-X
- Wiggler (synchrotron)
- WIND (spacecraft)
- Wingless Electromagnetic Air Vehicle
- Wireless energy transfer
- Wouthuysen-Field coupling

== X ==
- XANES, X-ray Absorption Near Edge Structure
- Xenon arc lamp
- X-ray transient
- X-ray astronomy
- X-shaped radio galaxy

== Z ==
- Zakharov system
- Zero-point energy
- ZETA (fusion reactor)
- Zonal and poloidal
- Zonal flow (plasma)
- Z Pulsed Power Facility
