= UHID =

UHID may refer to:

- Bell UH-1 Iroquois, a military helicopter
- U-HID (Ultra High Intensity Discharge), a type of lamp
- Universal Healthcare Identifier, see ASTM E 1714
- It is an abbreviation for Universal Human Interface Device. It is a circuit board & a keyboard replacement for MAME Emulation cabinets.
