= Strahl =

Strahl is a German word that means 'ray' or 'beam'. It may refer to the following:

- Strähl, a 2004 Swiss film
- Strahl (astronomy), a part of the solar wind electron velocity distribution that forms a beam
- Strahl (surname)
- Strahl (video game), a computer game

== See also ==
- Strähle construction, a geometrical technique for arranging the frets of some string instruments.
- Bremsstrahlung, "braking radiation", produced by the deceleration of a charged particle
