= Surface modification =

Act of modifying the surface of a material

Surface modification is the act of modifying the surface of a material by bringing physical, chemical or biological characteristics different from the ones originally found on the surface of a material. This modification is usually made to solid materials, but it is possible to find examples of the modification to the surface of specific liquids.

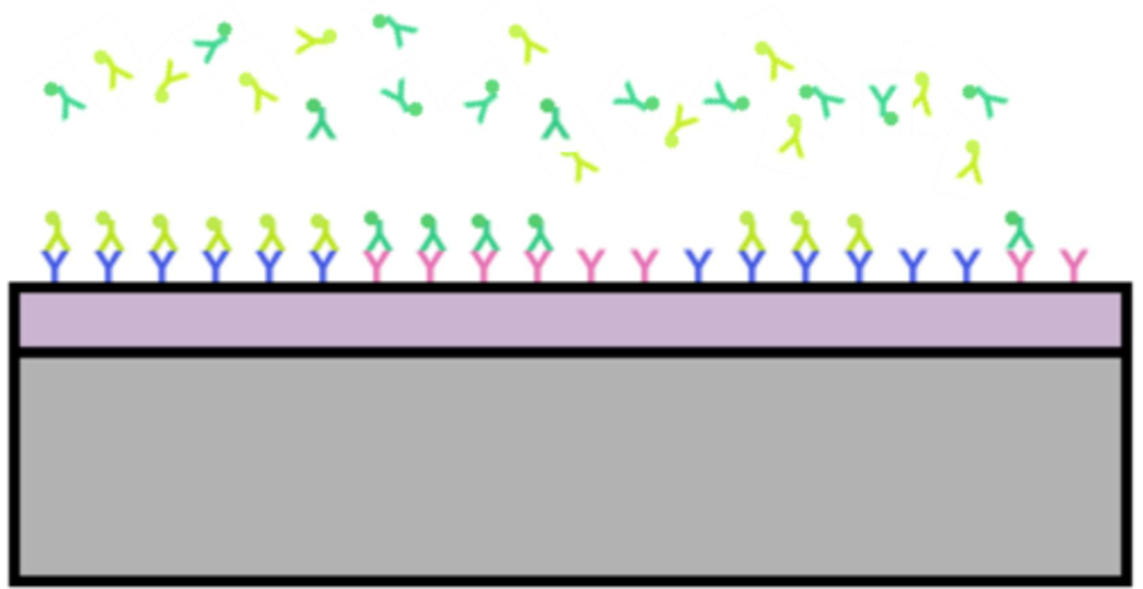
Surface modification of biomaterials with proteins

The modification can be done by different methods with a view to altering a wide range of characteristics of the surface, such as: roughness, hydrophilicity, surface charge, surface energy, biocompatibility and reactivity.

== Surface engineering ==
Surface engineering is the sub-discipline of materials science which deals with the surface of solid matter. It has applications to chemistry, mechanical engineering, and electrical engineering (particularly in relation to semiconductor manufacturing).

Solids are composed of a bulk material covered by a surface. The surface which bounds the bulk material is called the Surface phase. It acts as an interface to the surrounding environment. The bulk material in a solid is called the Bulk phase.

The surface phase of a solid interacts with the surrounding environment. This interaction can degrade the surface phase over time. Environmental degradation of the surface phase over time can be caused by wear, corrosion, fatigue and creep.

Surface engineering involves altering the properties of the surface phase in order to reduce the degradation over time. This is accomplished by making the surface robust and more suited to the environment in which it will be used.

=== Applications and Future of Surface Engineering ===
Surface engineering techniques are being used in the automotive, aerospace, missile, power, electronic, biomedical, textile, petroleum, petrochemical, chemical, steel, power, cement, machine tools, construction industries. Surface engineering techniques can be used to develop a wide range of functional properties, including physical, chemical, electrical, electronic, magnetic, mechanical, wear-resistant and corrosion-resistant properties at the required substrate surfaces. Almost all types of materials, including metals, ceramics, polymers, and composites can be coated on similar or dissimilar materials. It is also possible to form coatings of newer materials (e.g., met glass. beta-C_{3}N_{4}), graded deposits, multi-component deposits etc.

In 1995, surface engineering was a £10 billion market in the United Kingdom. Coatings, to make surface life robust from wear and corrosion, was approximately half the market.

Functionalization of Antimicrobial Surfaces is a technology that can be used for sterilization in the health industry, self-cleaning surfaces and protection from biofilms.

In recent years, there has been a paradigm shift in surface engineering from age-old electroplating to processes such as vapor phase deposition, diffusion, thermal spray & welding using advanced heat sources like plasma, laser, ion, electron, microwave, solar beams, synchrotron radiation, pulsed arc, pulsed combustion, spark, friction and induction.

It's estimated that loss due to wear and corrosion in the US is approximately $500 billion. In the US, there are around 9524 establishments (including automotive, aircraft, power and construction industries) who depend on engineered surfaces with support from 23,466 industries.

== Surface functionalization ==
Surface functionalization introduces chemical functional groups to a surface. This way, materials with functional groups on their surfaces can be designed from substrates with standard bulk material properties. Prominent examples can be found in semiconductor industry and biomaterial research.

=== Polymer Surface Functionalization ===
Plasma processing technologies are successfully employed for polymer surface functionalization.

== See also ==
- Surface finishing
- Surface science
- Tribology
- Surface metrology
- Surface modification of biomaterials with proteins
- Flame treatment

== Bibliography ==
- R.Chattopadhyay, 'Advanced Thermally Assisted Surface Engineering Processes' Kluwer Academic Publishers, MA, USA (now Springer, NY), 2004, ISBN 1-4020-7696-7, E-ISBN 1-4020-7764-5.
- R Chattopadhyay, 'Surface Wear- Analysis, Treatment, & Prevention', ASM-International, Materials Park, OH, USA, 2001, ISBN 0-87170-702-0.
- S Konda, Flame‐based synthesis and in situ functionalization of palladium alloy nanoparticles, AIChE Journal, 2018, https://onlinelibrary.wiley.com/doi/full/10.1002/aic.16368
