= Ecton =

Ecton may refer to:

== Placenames ==
- Ecton, Northamptonshire, village and civil parish in the Borough of Wellingborough, England
- Ecton, Staffordshire, hamlet in the Staffordshire Peak District, England

== Surnames ==
- John Ecton (died 1730), English compiler
- Zales Ecton (1898–1961), United States senator

== Other ==
- Ecton (physics), an explosive electron emission
