= Polymeric surface =

Polymeric materials have widespread application due to their versatile characteristics, cost-effectiveness, and highly tailored production. The science of polymer synthesis allows for excellent control over the properties of a bulk polymer sample. However, surface interactions of polymer substrates are an essential area of study in biotechnology, nanotechnology, and in all forms of coating applications. In these cases, the surface characteristics of the polymer and material, and the resulting forces between them largely determine its utility and reliability. In biomedical applications for example, the bodily response to foreign material, and thus biocompatibility, is governed by surface interactions. In addition, surface science is integral part of the formulation, manufacturing, and application of coatings.

== Chemical methods ==
A polymeric material can be functionalized by the addition of small moieties, oligomers, and even other polymers (grafting copolymers) onto the surface or interface.

=== Grafting copolymers ===
The two methods of co-polymer grafting. Notice the difference in density of polymer chains, the equilibrium conformation of polymer molecules in solution gives the "mushroom" regime shown for the grafting-onto method.

Grafting, in the context of polymer chemistry, refers to the addition of polymer chains onto a surface. In the so-called 'grafting onto' mechanism, a polymer chain adsorbs onto a surface out of solution. In the more extensive 'grafting from' mechanism, a polymer chain is initiated and propagated at the surface. Because pre-polymerized chains used in the 'grafting onto' method have a thermodynamically favored conformation in solution (an equilibrium hydrodynamic volume), their adsorption density is self-limiting. The radius of gyration of the polymer therefore is the limiting factor in the number of polymer chains that can reach the surface and adhere. The 'grafting from' technique circumvents this phenomenon and allows for greater grafting densities.

The processes of grafting "onto", "from", and "through" are all different ways to alter the chemical reactivity of the surface they attach with. Grafting onto allows a preformed polymer, generally in a "mushroom regime", to adhere to the surface of either a droplet or bead in solution. Due to the larger volume of the coiled polymer and the steric hindrance this causes, the grafting density is lower for 'onto' in comparison to 'grafting from'. The surface of the bead is wetted by the polymer and the interaction in the solution caused the polymer to become more flexible. The 'extended conformation' of the polymer grafted, or polymerized, from the surface of the bead means that the monomer must be in the solution and there for lyophilic. This results with a polymer that has favorable interactions with the solution, allowing the polymer to form more linearly. Grafting from therefore has a higher grafting density since there are more access to chain ends.

Peptide synthesis can provide one example of a 'grafting from' synthetic process. In this process, an amino acid chain is grown by a series of condensation reaction from a polymer bead surface. This grafting technique allows for excellent control over the peptide composition as the bonded chain can be washed without desorption from the polymer.

Polymeric coatings are another area of applied grafting techniques. In the formulation of water-borne paint, latex particles are often surface modified to control particle dispersion and thus coating characteristics such as viscosity, film formation, and environmental stability (UV exposure and temperature variations).

=== Oxidation ===
Plasma processing, corona treatment, and flame treatment can all be classified as surface oxidation mechanisms. These methods all involve cleavage of polymer chains in the material and the incorporation of carbonyl, and hydroxyl functional groups. The incorporation of oxygen into the surface creates a higher surface energy allowing the substrate to be coated.

== Methodology ==
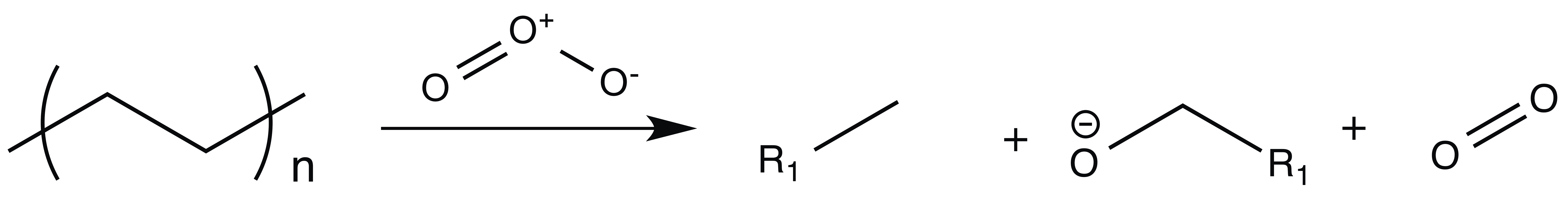
An example reaction scheme for the cleavage of bonds in the polymer chains of a polyolefin surface. The presence of ozone, as the result of an ionizing electric arc produced by a Corona treater for example, leads to oxidation of the surface yielding polar functionalities.

=== Oxidizing polymeric surfaces ===
==== Corona treatment ====
Corona treatment is a surface modification method using a low temperature corona discharge to increase the surface energy of a material, often polymers and natural fibers. Most commonly, a thin polymer sheet is rolled through an array of high-voltage electrodes, using the plasma created to functionalize the surface. The limited penetration depth of such treatment provides vastly improved adhesion while preserving bulk mechanical properties.

Commercially, corona treatment has been used widely for improved dye adhesion before printing text and images on plastic packaging materials. The hazardous nature of remnant ozone after corona treatment stipulates careful filtration and ventilation during processing, restricting its implementation to applications with strict catalytic filtered systems. This limitation prevents widespread use within open-line manufacturing processes

Several factors influence the efficiency of the flame treatment such as air-to-gas ratio, thermal output, surface distance, and oxidation zone dwell time. Upon conception of the process, a corona treatment immediately followed film extrusions, but the development of careful transportation techniques allows treatment at an optimized location. Conversely, in-line corona treatments have been implemented into full-scale production lines such as those in the newspaper industry. These in-line solutions are developed to counteract the decrease in wetting characteristics caused by excessive solvent use.

==== Atmosphere- and pressure-dependent plasma processing ====
Plasma processing provides interfacial energies and injected monomer fragments larger than comparable processes. However, limited fluxes prevent high process rates. In addition, plasmas are thermodynamically unfavorable and therefore plasma-processed surfaces lack uniformity, consistency, and permanence. These obstacles with plasma processing preclude it from being a competitive surface modification method within industry. The process begins with production of plasma via ionization either by deposition on monomer mixtures or gaseous carrier ions. The power required to produce the necessary plasma flux can be derived from the active volume mass/energy balance:

$\textstyle \int\limits_{{V\!ol}_I} {k^{ion}}{n_e}{n_0}\, d{{V\!ol}_I}={\frac{n_e}{\tau_n}}{V\!ol_I}$

where

${{V\!ol}_I}$ is the active volume

$k^{ion}$ is the ionization rate

$n_0$ is the neutral density

$n_e$ is the electron density

$\tau_n$ is the ion loss by diffusion, convection, attachment, and recombination

Dissipation is generally initiated via direct current (DC), radio frequency (RF), or microwave power. Gas ionization efficiency can decrease the power efficiency more than tenfold depending on the carrier plasma and substrate.

==== Flamed plasma processing ====
Flame treatment is a controlled, rapid, cost-effective method of increasing surface energy and wettability of polyolefins and metallic components. This high-temperature plasma treatment uses ionized gaseous oxygen via jet flames across a surface to add polar functional groups while melting the surface molecules, locking them into place upon cooling.

Thermoplastic polyethylene and polypropylene treated with brief oxygen plasma exposure have seen contact angles as low as 22°, and the resulting surface modification can last years with proper packaging. Flame plasma treatment has become increasingly popular with intravascular devices such as balloon catheters due to the precision and cost-effectiveness demanded in the medical industry.

=== Grafting techniques ===
Grafting copolymers to a surface can be envisioned as fixing polymeric chains to a structurally different polymer substrate with the intention of changing surface functionality while preserving bulk mechanical properties. The nature and degree of surface functionalization is determined by both the choice of copolymer and the type and extent of grafting.

==== Photografting ====
The modification of inert surfaces of polyolefins, polyesters, and polyamides by grafting functional vinyl monomers has been used to increase hydrophobicity, dye absorption, and polymer adhesion. This photografting method is generally used during continuous filament or thin film processing. On a bulk commercial scale, the grafting technique is referred to as photoinitiated lamination, where desired surfaces are joined by grafting a polymeric adhesion network between the two films. The low adhesion and absorption of polyolefins, polyesters, and polyamides is improved by UV-irradiation of an initiator and monomer transferred through the vapor phase to the substrate. Functionalization of porous surfaces have seen great success with high temperature photografting techniques.

In microfluidic chips, functionalizing channels allows directed flow to preserve lamellar behavior between and within junctions. The adverse turbulent flow in microfluidic applications can compound component failure modes due to the increased level of channel interdependency and network complexity. In addition, the imprinted design of microfluidic channels can be reproduced for photografting the corresponding channels with a high degree of accuracy.

== Surface analytical techniques ==
=== Surface energy measurement ===
In industrial corona and plasma processes, cost-efficient and rapid analytical methods are required for confirming adequate surface functionality on a given substrate. Measuring the surface energy is an indirect method for confirming the presence of surface functional groups without the need for microscopy or spectroscopy, often expensive and demanding tools. Contact angle measurement (goniometry) can be used to find the surface energy of the treated and non-treated surface. Young's relation can be used to find surface energy assuming the simplification of experimental conditions to a three phase equilibrium (i.e. liquid drop applied to flat rigid solid surface in a controlled atmosphere), yielding

$\boldsymbol{\gamma}_{SG} = \boldsymbol{\gamma}_{SL} + \boldsymbol{\gamma}_{LG}~{\cos {\boldsymbol{\theta}_c}}$

where

$\boldsymbol{\gamma}_{ij}$ denotes the surface energy of the solid–liquid, liquid–gas, or solid–gas interface

${\boldsymbol{\theta}_c}$ is the measured contact angle

A series of solutions with known surface tension (e.g., Dyne solutions) can be used to estimate the surface energy of the polymer substrate qualitatively by observing the wettability of each. These methods are applicable to macroscopic surface oxidation, as in industrial processing.

=== Infrared spectroscopy ===
In the case of oxidizing treatments, spectra taken from treated surfaces will indicate the presence of functionalities in carbonyl and hydroxyl regions according to the Infrared spectroscopy correlation table.

=== XPS and EDS ===
X-ray photoelectron spectroscopy (XPS) and Energy-dispersive X-ray spectroscopy (EDS/EDX) are composition characterization techniques that use x-ray excitation of electrons to discrete energy levels to quantify chemical composition. These techniques provide characterization at surface depths of 1–10 nanometers, approximately the range of oxidation in plasma and corona treatments. In addition, these processes offer the benefit of characterizing microscopic variations in surface composition.

In the context of plasma processed polymer surfaces, oxidized surfaces will obviously show a greater oxygen content. Elemental analysis allows for quantitative data to be obtained and used in the analysis of process efficiency.

=== Atomic force microscopy ===
Atomic force microscopy (AFM), a type of scanning force microscopy, was developed for mapping three-dimensional topographical variations in atomic surfaces with high resolution (on the order of fraction of nanometers). AFM was developed to overcome the material conduction limitations of electron transmission and scanning microscopy methods (SEM & STM). Invented by Binnig, Quate, and Gerbe in 1985, atomic force microscopy uses laser beam deflection to measure the variations in atomic surfaces. The method does not rely on the variation in electron conduction through the material, as the scanning tunneling microscope (STM) does, and therefore allow microscopy on nearly all materials, including polymers.

The application of AFM on polymeric surfaces is especially favorable because polymer general lack of crystallinity leads to large variations in surface topography. Surface functionalization techniques such as grafting, corona treatment, and plasma processing increase the surface roughness greatly (compared to the unprocessed substrate surface) and are therefore accurately measured by AFM.

== Applications ==
=== Biomaterials ===
Biomaterial surfaces are often modified using light-activated mechanisms (such as photografting) to functionalize the surface without compromising bulk mechanical properties.

The modification of surfaces to keep polymers biologically inert has found wide uses in biomedical applications such as cardiovascular stents and in many skeletal prostheses. Functionalizing polymer surfaces can inhibit protein adsorption, which may otherwise initiate cellular interrogation upon the implant, a predominant failure mode of medical prostheses.

Polymer	Medical Application	Functionalization Method & Purpose
Polyvinylchloride (PVC)	Endotracheal tubes	Plasma processed to increase hydrophobicity
Silicone rubber	Breast implants	Glow-discharge plasma processed coatings with halofuginone to prevent capsular fibrosis
Polyethylene (PE)	Synthetic vascular grafts	Polydimethylsiloxane (PDMS) microfluidic patterning for selective adsorption of fibronectin
Polymethylmethacrylate (PMMA)	Intraocular lenses	Photografting nanoelectromechanical structures to increase photopic sensitivity

Narrow biocompatibility requirements within the medical industry have over the past ten years driven surface modification techniques to reach an unprecedented level of accuracy.

=== Coatings ===
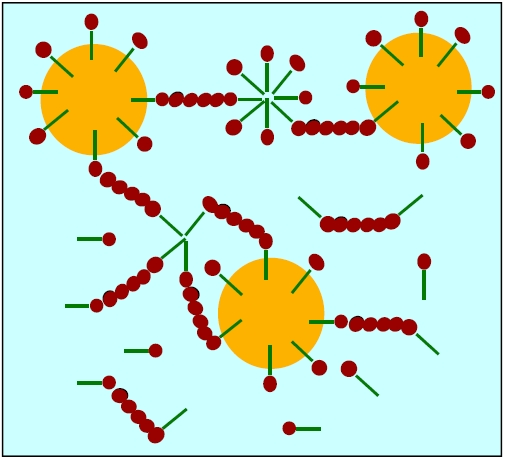
Adsorbed functionalities (e.g., surfact molecules) on a dispersed polymer particle interact with solvated associative thickeners (e.g., aqueous cellulosic polymer) yielding novel rheological behavior.

In water-borne coatings, an aqueous polymer dispersion creates a film on the substrate once the solvent has evaporated. Surface functionalization of the polymer particles is a key component of a coating formulation allowing control over such properties as dispersion, film formation temperature, and the coating rheology. Dispersing aids often involve steric or electrostatic repulsion of the polymer particles, providing colloidal stability. The dispersing aids adsorb (as in a grafting onto scheme) onto latex particles giving them functionality. The association of other additives, such as thickeners shown in the schematic to the right, with adsorbed polymer material give rise to complex rheological behavior and excellent control over a coating's flow properties.

== See also ==
- Surface modification
- Surface engineering
- Tribology
