= Bush hammer =

Masonry tool used to texturize stone and concrete

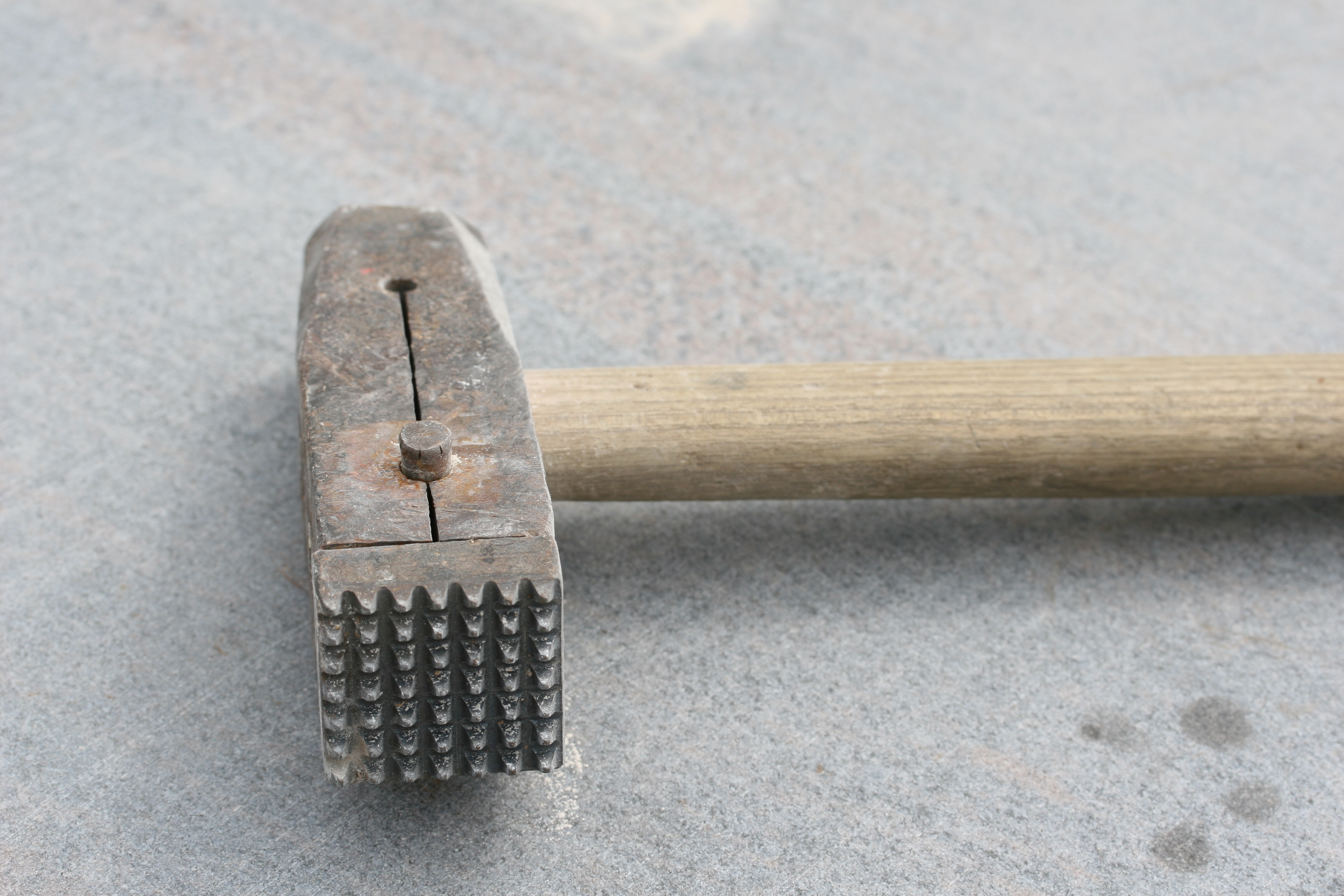
Hand-driven bush hammer

A bush hammer, also known as an axe hammer, is a masonry tool used to texturize stone and concrete. The term is derived from the German word bosshammer, where Old German bossen meant "to beat".

== Description and use ==
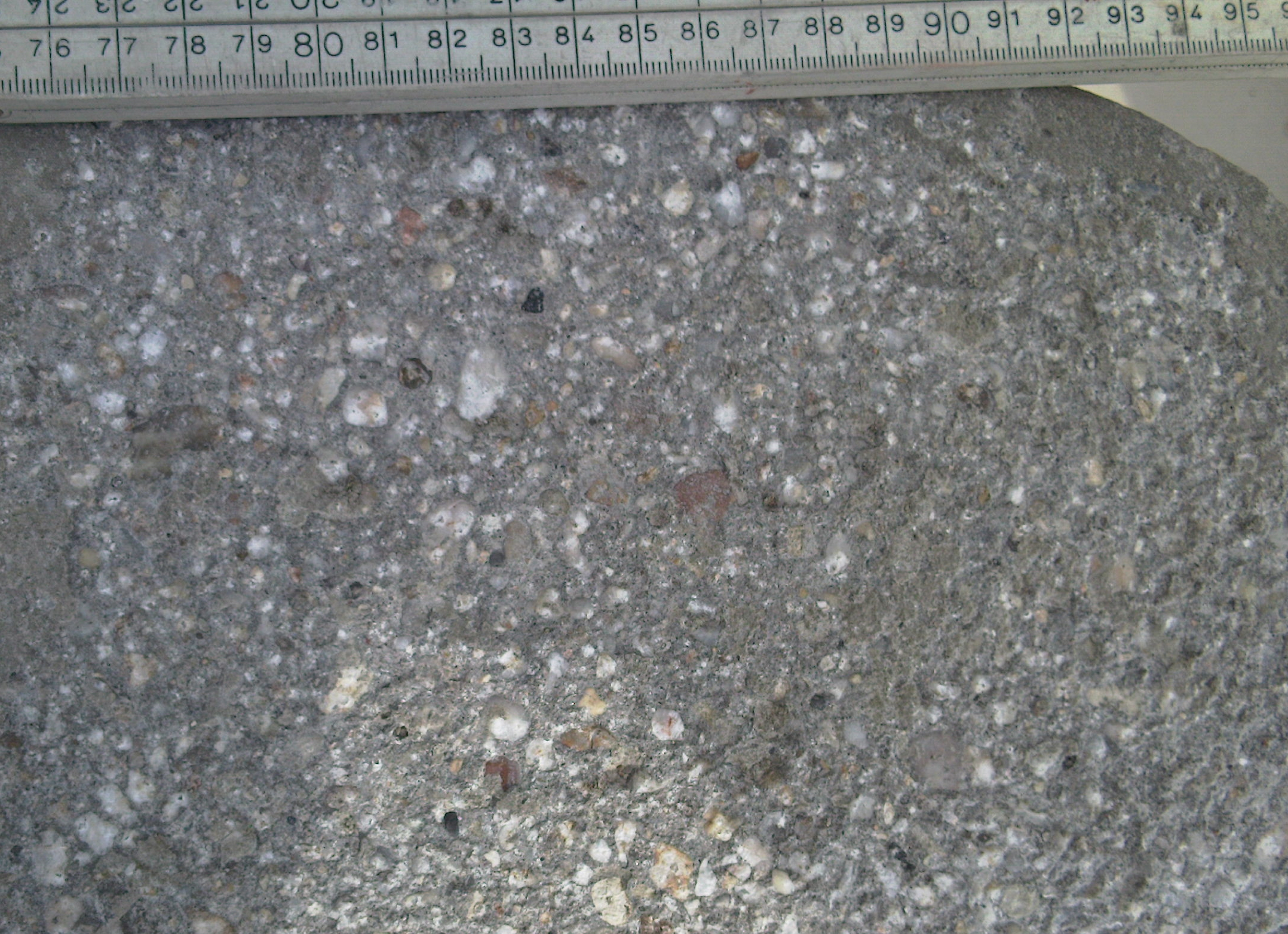
A bush-hammered concrete surface

Bush hammers exist in many forms, from simple hand-held hammers to large electric machines, but the basic functional property of the tool is always the same – a grid of conical or pyramidal points at the end of a large metal slug. The repeated impact of these points into stone or concrete creates a rough, pockmarked texture that resembles naturally weathered rock. They can help to increase bonding effectiveness when applying new concrete to an existing concrete surface by increasing the surface area of the bonding zone.

The bush hammer has been modernized, making it easier for the users to perform tasks while still producing the intended effect. Powered machines are built to give the impression that a hand-powered bush hammer has been applied to the concrete. This allows contractors to work on a larger amount of the material without using individual hammers for the project. This saves time and labor costs for those working with the tool. There are angled points that rotate to help imitate this tool.

== History ==
In 1831, Joseph Richards (1784–1848) invented the bush hammer. The US patent was issued February 20, 1828, for a stone-working tool, with a patent number of 5010X. His patent sparked many other inventors' designs for the bush hammer.

== Similar tools ==
The bush hammer is the patented title for this tool but has also been called different names over the years. The other most common name was the patent hammer which is described to have the same features and was used around the same time of the bush hammer. Another name this tool can go by is the axe hammer. This is due to the sharp conical edges the face of the hammer would contain.

== Gallery ==
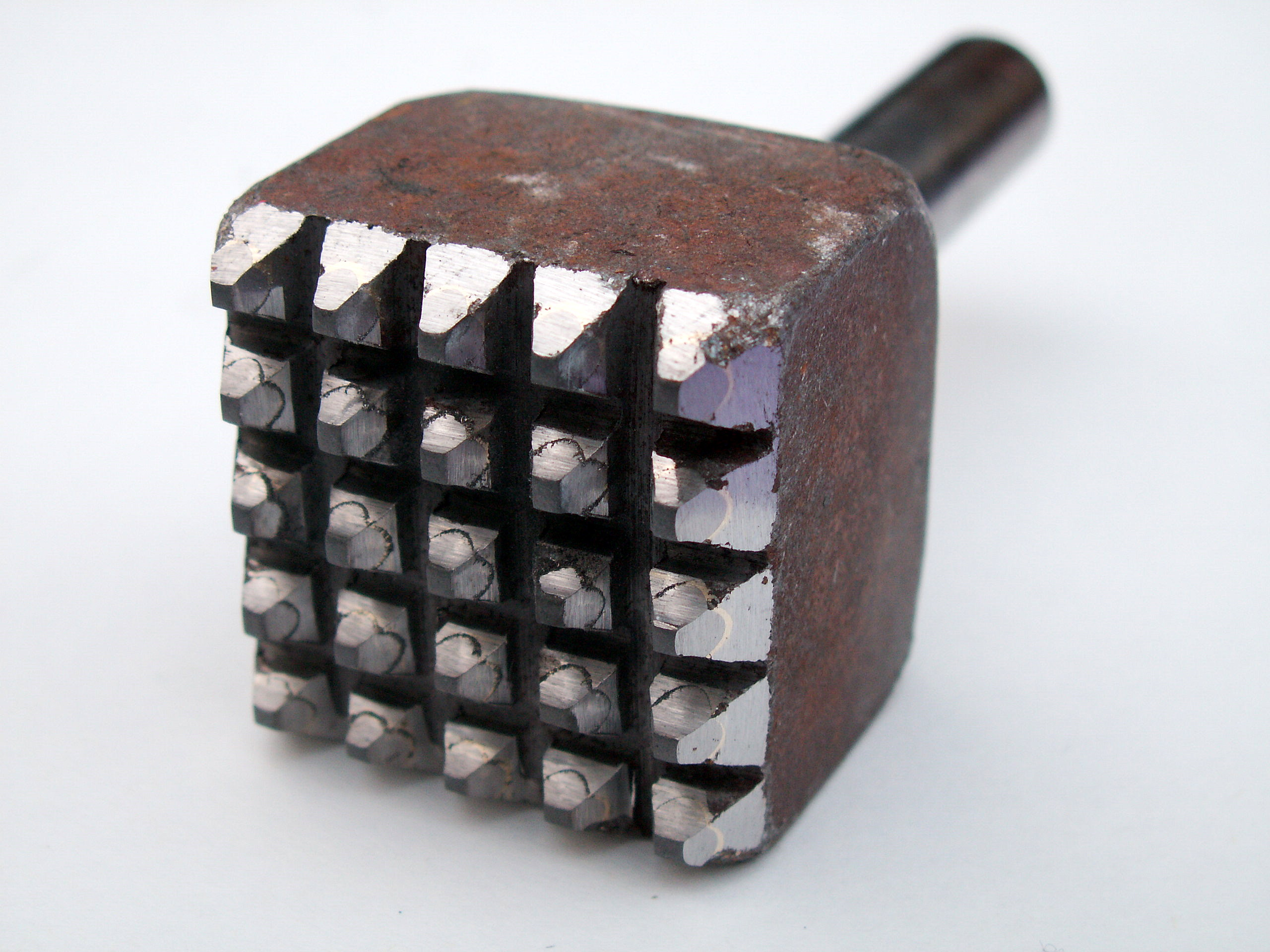
A bush hammer chisel for pneumatic hammers

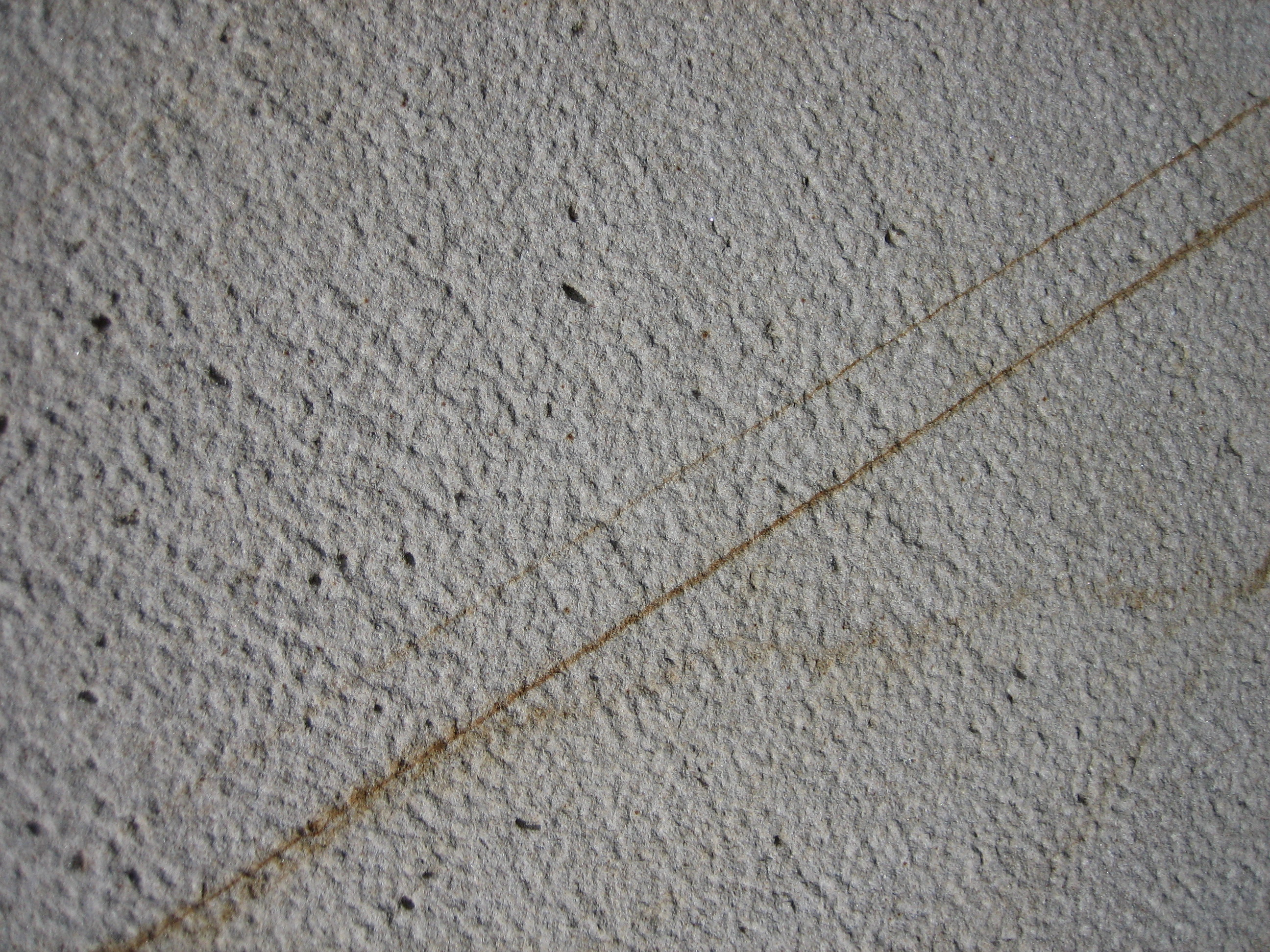
Bush-hammered sandstone

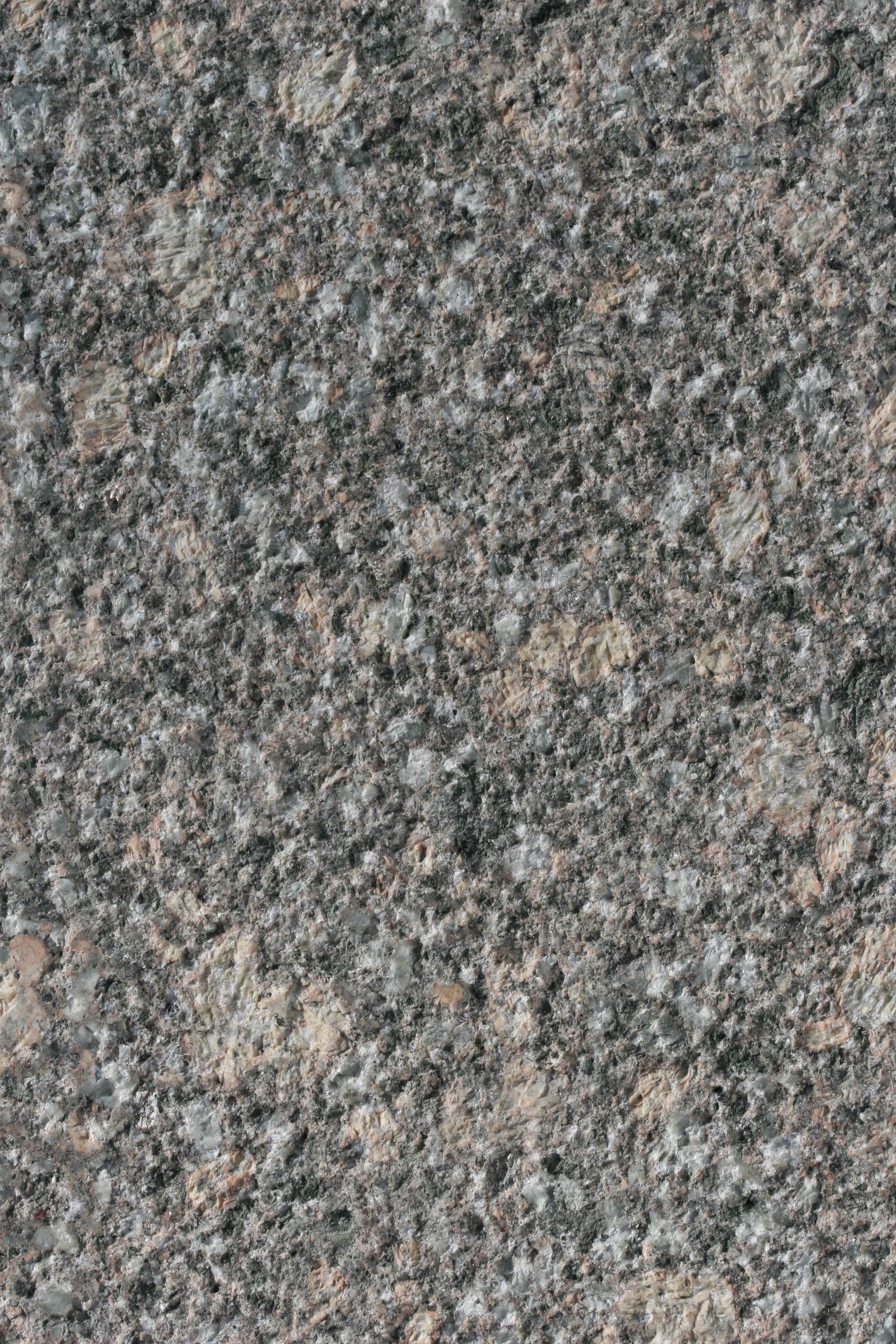
Bush-hammered granite porphyry

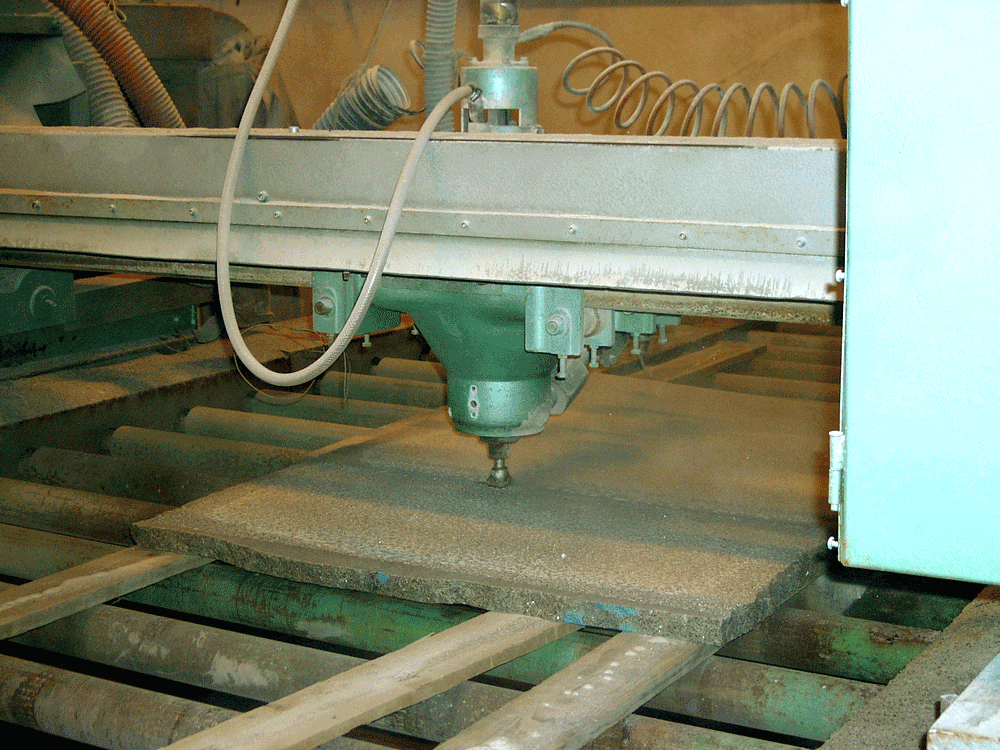
Bush-hammering machine

== See also ==
- Henri Bouchard – French sculptor
- Scabbling – Process to remove a thin layer of stone or concrete by rapid impacts with a small hard tool tip
- Stone flaming – Application of high temperature to the surface of stone to make it look like natural weathering
