= Stone flaming =

Method of artificially weathering stone

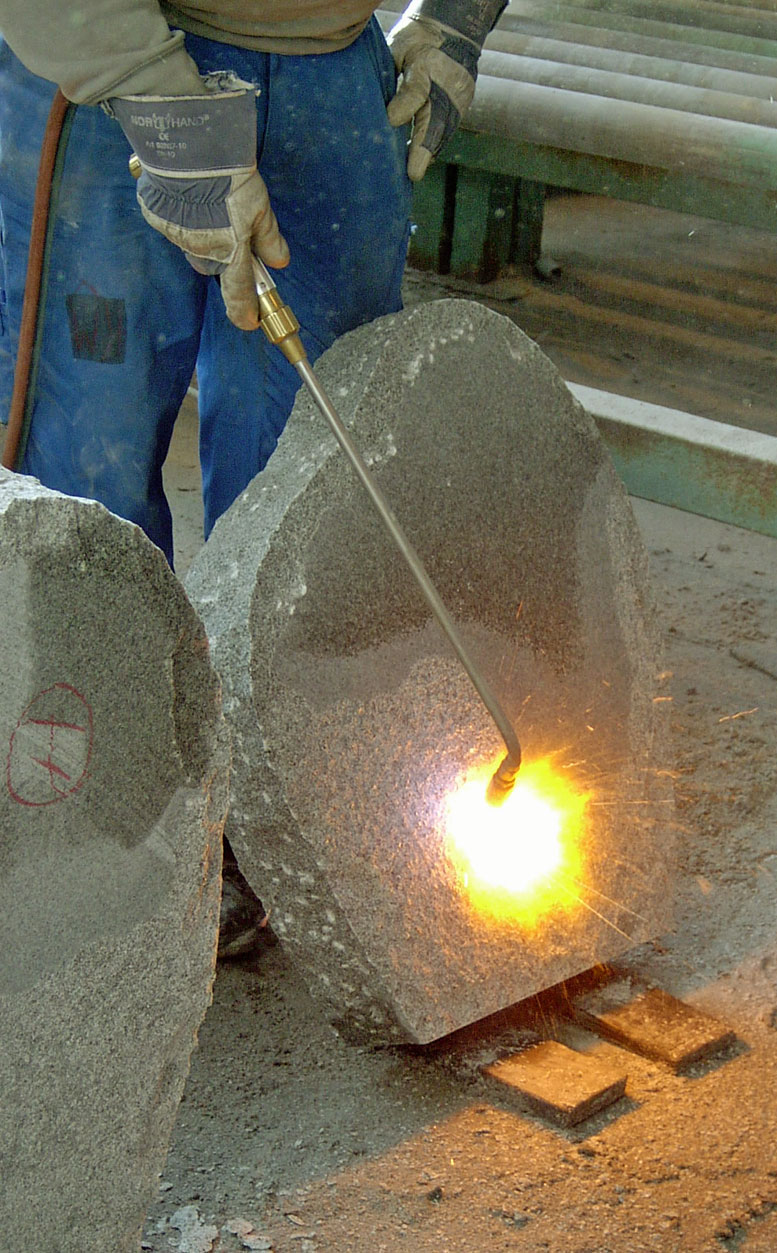
Manually flaming the surface of a stone slab

Stone flaming or thermaling is the application of high temperature to the surface of stone to make it look like natural weathering. The sudden application of a torch to the surface of stone causes the surface layer to expand and flake off, exposing rough stone.

Flaming works well on granite, because granite is made up of minerals with differing heat expansion rates.

== Process ==
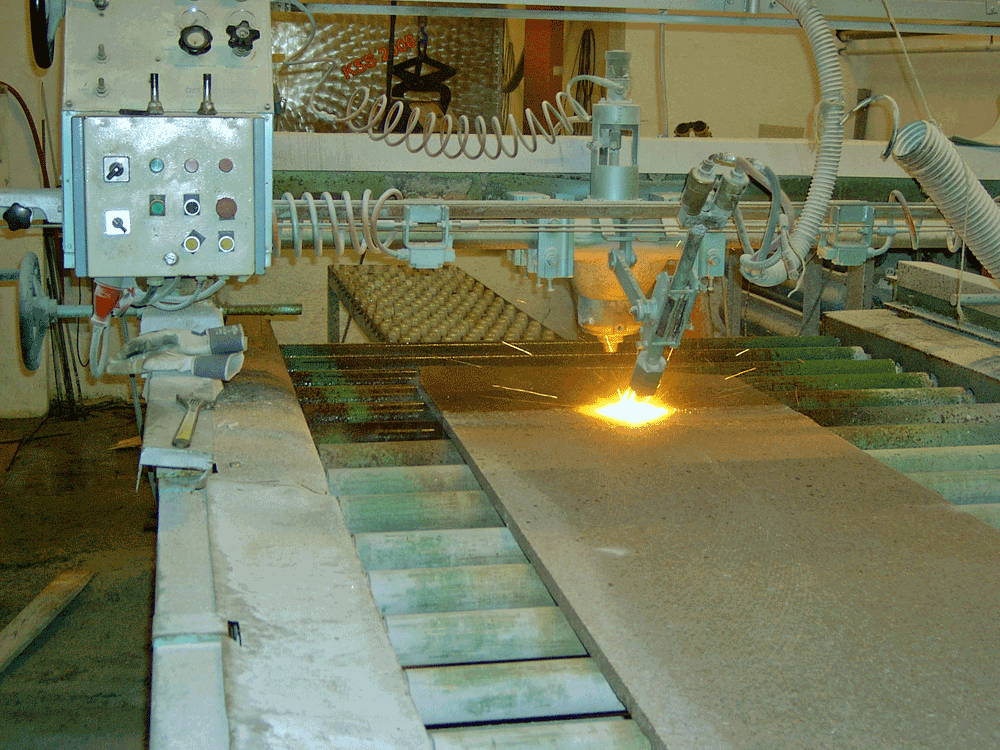
Machine flaming the surface of a stone slab

After removing a rock from a quarry, the rock is sliced into multiple flat slabs using a diamond gang saw. The saw leaves flat surfaces with circular marks. Flaming is done by wetting, and then running an oxygen-acetylene or oxygen-propane torch over the surface. As shown in both pictures, the torch is usually held at a 45-degree angle to the stone, so that released glowing sand grains are blown away in a harmless direction.

== Alternatives ==
Alternative techniques for creating a rough surface on sawed stone include:

- bush hammering
- sandblasting
- hydrofinishing

== See also ==
Flame treatment
