= Columbia Non-neutral Torus =

Stellarator at the Columbia University Plasma Physics Laboratory

The Columbia Non-neutral Torus (CNT) is a small stellarator at the Columbia University Plasma Physics Laboratory designed by Thomas Sunn Pedersen with the aid of Wayne Reiersen and Fred Dahlgren of the Princeton Plasma Physics Laboratory to conduct the first investigation of non-neutral plasmas confined on magnetic surfaces. The experiment, which began operation in November 2004, is funded by the National Science Foundation and the United States Department of Energy in the form of a Faculty Early Career Development (CAREER) award.

== Technical design ==
CNT, which is housed in a cylindrical vacuum chamber made of 316 stainless steel, measures 60 inches in diameter and stands 75 inches tall. The empty chamber is capable of reaching a pressure of 2 × 10^{−10} Torr.

CNT is unique in its simple geometry. Magnetic surfaces are created using only four electromagnetic coils – two interlocking coils inside the chamber, and two poloidal field coils outside the chamber. The two interlocking coils have a radius of .405m, and the angle between them can be manually selected to be 64°, 78°, or 88°, allowing for different shear and rotational transform values, and magnetic surface configuration. The poloidal field coils have a radius of 1.08 m. The coils are powered by a 200 kW power supply and are capable of producing magnetic fields of 0.01–0.2T. The configuration of CNT creates a very low aspect ratio of 1.9, the lowest of any stellarator built.

Parameter	Value
n_{e}	10^{12}−10^{14} m^{−3}
T_{e}	1–100 eV
B	0.01–0.2 T
R	0.3 m
a	0.1 m
P	10^{−10} Torr

== Research ==
Thomas Sunn Pedersen is the principal investigator of CNT, which studies several areas of theoretical and experimental non-neutral plasma physics. These include the equilibrium of non-neutral plasmas, transport and confinement, and ion-related instabilities. The CNT theory program is run by Pedersen and Prof. Allen Boozer, also at Columbia University.

First studies on CNT showed the successful creation of magnetic surfaces with the simple four coil design. At sufficiently low neutral pressures and sufficiently high magnetic field strengths, the plasmas are essentially pure electron plasmas and are macroscopically stable with confinement times of up to 20 ms. Transport is driven by collisions with neutrals as well as E x B drift along insulating rods inserted into the plasma. At higher neutral pressures (10^{−7} Torr and above), an ion related instability is observed, with a frequency in the 10–50 kHz range, and a poloidal mode number m = 1.

The CNT group installed a conducting boundary in August 2007 to study its effects on confinement times, and to allow measurements in the absence of internal rods. Future plans for CNT include the study of electron-positron plasmas confined on magnetic surfaces and further studies of partly neutralized plasmas.
