= Magnetic proton recoil neutron spectrometer =

Magnetic Proton Recoil neutron spectrometer is a large high-resolution neutron spectrometer installed at JET.

== History ==
The Magnetic Proton Recoil (MPR) neutron spectrometer is a thin-foil spectrometer which was installed at JET in 1996 and upgraded (MPRu) 2001-2005.

== Principle ==
In the MPR the fusion neutrons are collimated into a neutron beam. The neutron beam is directed onto a thin plastic film (Polyethylene) where the neutrons scatter elastically on the protons of the foil. The recoil protons emitted in the forward direction enter a magnetic part of the spectrometer where they are momentum analyzed and focused onto the focal plane. An array of plastic scintillators coupled to photomultiplier tubes (PMTs) register the spatial distribution of the protons. This proton distribution is then related to the neutron energy spectrum.

== Field-of-view ==
The MPR has a semi-tangential line of sight through the plasma. The MPR has a 700 mm long cylindrical steel neutron collimator with a 10-cm2 bore. At a distance 170 mm behind the end of the collimator is placed a 10 cm2 polythene conversion foil, defining the active area of the spectrometer. The collimator-foil arrangement defines the spectrometers field-of-view into the plasma.

== Uses ==
The MPR determines the neutron spectrum from which important plasma parameters can be determined, such as the ion temperature, the collective motion of the main plasma, the fuel ion densities and their velocity distributions.
