= Microwave digestion =

Microwave digestion is a chemical technique used to decompose sample material into a solution suitable for quantitative elemental analysis. It is commonly used to prepare samples for analysis using inductively coupled plasma mass spectrometry (ICP-MS), atomic absorption spectroscopy, and atomic emission spectroscopy (including ICP-AES).

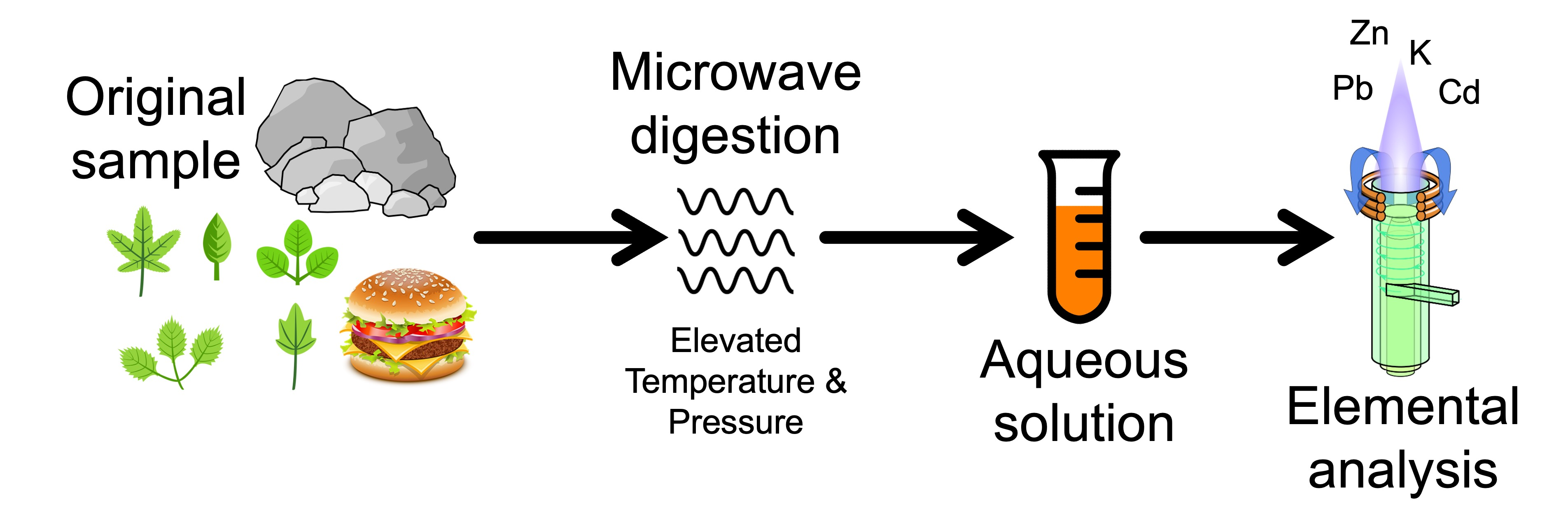
A vast array of materials (e.g. plants, food, rocks, etc.) can be transformed by exposure to microwave energy in a closed vessel. The increased temperatures and pressures, in combination with reactive compounds (usually strong acids) produce an aqueous solution in which the elements are fully dissolved. This solution is then diluted and analyzed. In this flow diagram, the solution sample is entering an inductively coupled plasma (ICP) torch. (Torch diagram is from this Wikipedia article.)

To perform the digestion, sample material is combined with a concentrated strong acid or a mixture thereof, most commonly using nitric acid, hydrochloric acid and/or hydrofluoric acid, in a closed PTFE vessel. The vessel and its contents are then exposed to microwave irradiation, raising the pressure and temperature of the solution mixture. The elevated pressures and temperatures within a low pH sample medium increase both the speed of thermal decomposition of the sample and the solubility of elements in solution. Organic compounds are decomposed into gaseous form, effectively removing them from solution. Once these elements are in solution, it is possible to quantify elemental concentrations within samples.

Microwaves can be programmed to reach specific temperatures or ramp up to a given temperature at a specified rate. The temperature in the interior of the vessel is monitored by an infrared external sensor or by a optic fiber probe, and the microwave power is regulated to maintain the temperature defined by the active program. The vessel solution must contain at least one solvent that absorbs microwave radiation, usually water. The specific blend of acids (or other reagents) and the temperatures vary depending upon the type of sample being digested. Often a standardized protocol for digestion is followed, such as an Environmental Protection Agency Method.

== Comparison between microwave digestion and other sample preparation methods ==
Before microwave digestion technology was developed, samples were digested using less convenient methods, such as heating vessels in an oven, typically for at least 24 hours. The use of microwave energy allows for fast sample heating, reducing digestion time to as little as one hour.

Another common means to decompose samples for elemental analysis is dry-ashing, in which samples are incinerated in a muffle furnace. The resultant ash is then dissolved for analysis, usually into dilute nitric acid. While this method is simple, inexpensive and does not require concentrated acids, it cannot be used for volatile elements such as mercury and can increase the likelihood of background contamination. The incineration will not convert all elements to soluble salts, necessitating an additional digestion step.

== Quality control in microwave digestion ==
In microwave digestion, 100% analyte recovery cannot be assumed. To account for this, scientists perform tests such as fortification recovery, in which a spike (a known amount of the target analyte) is added to test samples. These spiked samples are then analyzed to determine whether the expected increase in analyte concentration occurs.

Contamination from improperly cleaned digestion vessels is also a possibility. As such, in any microwave digestion, blank samples need to be digested to determine if there is background contamination.
