= Magnetic field oscillating amplified thruster =

The magnetic field oscillating amplified thruster (MOA; often named as plasma engine by the media) is a versatile electrothermodynamic system, which is able to accelerate nearly every electrically charged gaseous medium (plasma application) to extremely high velocities, thereby generating a high energetic plasma jet in the exhaust and also electrical conductive fluids (hydrodynamic application) in general.

To do so, MOA utilizes a so-called Alfvén wave, a physical principle within magnetohydrodynamics that was described first in 1942 by the later Nobel Prize winner Hannes Alfvén and which states that fluctuating magnetic fields can induce density waves in electric conductive media (e.g., plasma, salty water, etc.). These density waves can reach very high velocities and as the particles inside the medium are coupled to them, the particles are as well accelerated to very high velocities, accordingly reaching very high kinetic energies.

Due to the heating mechanism based on adiabatic compression, MOA is fundamentally different from other electrothermal thrusters, especially from the magnetoplasmadynamic or MPD thruster with which it is sometimes compared by the collective term of a plasma engine.

== Application areas ==
Because of the high exhaust velocities and the associated high specific impulse and/or the high particle energy, two prime application areas emerge: spaceflight and coating of particular materials. For the spaceflight case, the high specific impulse leads to a relevant reduction in propellant consumption (up to 90%) when comparing MOA to current state-of-the-art ion engines. For the coating case, the high kinetic energy of the exhaust particles leads to a high penetration depth within the target material. This allows for example to harden steel, aluminum and other metals, but also to change the material properties of glass and plastics.

An additional advantage of the MOA concept is its corrosion free behaviour, leading to a long lifetime of the system. The same magnetic fields that generate the Alfvén waves, prohibit high energy particles from hitting the thruster's wall or any other of MOA's structural components, therefore avoiding any particle induced damage almost inherently.

== Set-up of the MOA System ==
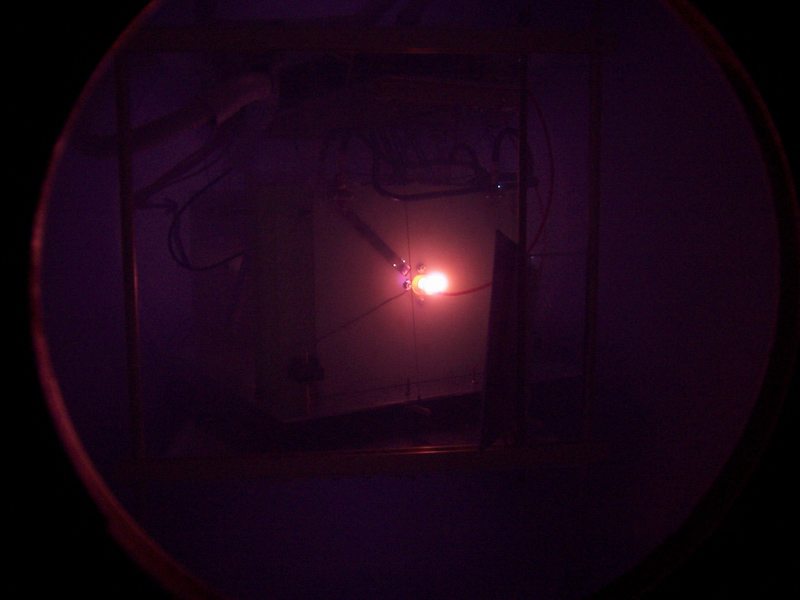
Firing of the MOA Thruster inside of a vacuum chamber

Plasma Application

In principle the MOA thruster is composed of five subsystems:

- Plasma generator,
- Central tube,
- Primary coil,
- Secondary coil,
- Supply and control units.

The plasma generator produces a continuous flow of ionized particles, which drift inside the central tube towards the magnetic exhaust nozzle. These particles could for example be nitrogen- or hydrogen molecules, as well as noble gases like argon or xenon or any other gaseous stuff. Since the particles are ionized, they react on the two magnetic fields, which are generated by the primary and the secondary coil. Of these two, the primary coil is permanently switched on as it also forms the magnetic exhaust nozzle, while the secondary coil is cyclically switched on and off to deform the magnetic field lines of the system. By this deformation Alfvén Waves are generated, which – in the next step – transport, compress and accelerate the propulsive medium to specific pre-defined parameters. Finally the supply and control units make sure that the MOA thruster operates within the anticipated parameters.

As the concept requires a plasma generator to produce the ionized particles, MOA can in principle be described as an electric propulsion system, similar to an ion engine. However, because of the interaction of the magnetic fields, the particles are as well compressed and adiabatically heated up, thereby turning the whole system into a electrothermodynamic system. The combination of electric and thermodynamic principles leads also to a unification of the respective advantages. As such MOA features on one hand the high efficiency of the electric propulsion systems and on the other hand the ability to accelerate a high number of particles – just like a thermal system – therefore achieving a relatively high thrust at a high specific impulse. The combination of high particle energy/exhaust velocity and relatively high thrust in this form is a novel proposal. The high flexibility of changing thrust and specific impulse in-flight by adapting massflow and power consumption is at the moment a unique feature provided by this novel thruster concept.

Hydrodynamic Application

In the hydro-dynamic application MOA differs primarily in that the plasma source is no longer required. Fundamentally for its function is the support with an electrical conductive fluid or an electrolyte available from a tank or an environmental reservoir (salty sea water, etc.).

== History and Current status ==
MOA was originally invented and defined by Manfred Hettmer in 1982. He also developed the system from a theoretical model into a practical device after reaching a basic level of own funding by his entrepreneurship in the IT-branche. In the first logical step in 1998 he began coding a computer simulation and built a mock-up for defining components and functions in 1999 (at first without a plasma source). By establishing professional contacts, Hettmer was also able to put together a small team. The first tests with a functional breadboard model were performed in a laboratory of the LRT (Institute of Astronautics) of the Technical University of Munich in Garching. A first patent application was filed in 2003.

In an expert opinion by Horst Loeb (winner of the Stuhlinger Medal in 2005) at the Justus-Liebig-University Gießen, the MOA concept was also confirmed on the basis of the technical concept and the simulation data created by Hettmer.

Finally a laboratory at the Technical University Graz could be used for further testing. At the Institute of Communication Networks and Satellite Communication the test campaign continued and showed the feasibility of the MOA concept. The obtained results were presented at the International Astronautical Congress in Fukuoka, Japan, on October 21, 2005. An article written by Hettmer was published in a journal in Germany in 2006.

The dedicated company called QASAR Technologieentwicklung Ges.m.b.H. (Austrian Company register HG Wien FN 268333h ) founded by Hettmer in 2003 had been set up to further develop the MOA technology and to test potential terrestrial applications, both for spaceflight, in the area of coating and other areas. In summer 2005, the MOA prototype has reached TRL 5 (technology readiness level) after the component and/or breadboard has been validated in a relevant environment.

After QASAR Technologieentwicklung Ges.m.b.H. was closed at the beginning of 2009 due to internal difficulties with shareholders and investors, Hettmer continued the project largely with its own funds within the given possibilities. The implementation of a commercial application is planned.

== See also ==
- Spacecraft propulsion
