= Flame treatment =

Application of a gas flame to the surface of a material

Flame treatment is the application of a gas flame to the surface of a material to improve adhesion.

Polyolefins, especially polyethylene and polypropylene bond poorly, because they consist of long non-polar molecules. Without special treatment, adhesives, ink, and other coatings cannot be applied to these materials. By rapidly applying intense heat to a surface, molecular chains are broken and polar functional groups are added. Flame treatment also burns off dust, fibers, oils, and other surface contaminants.

== Process ==
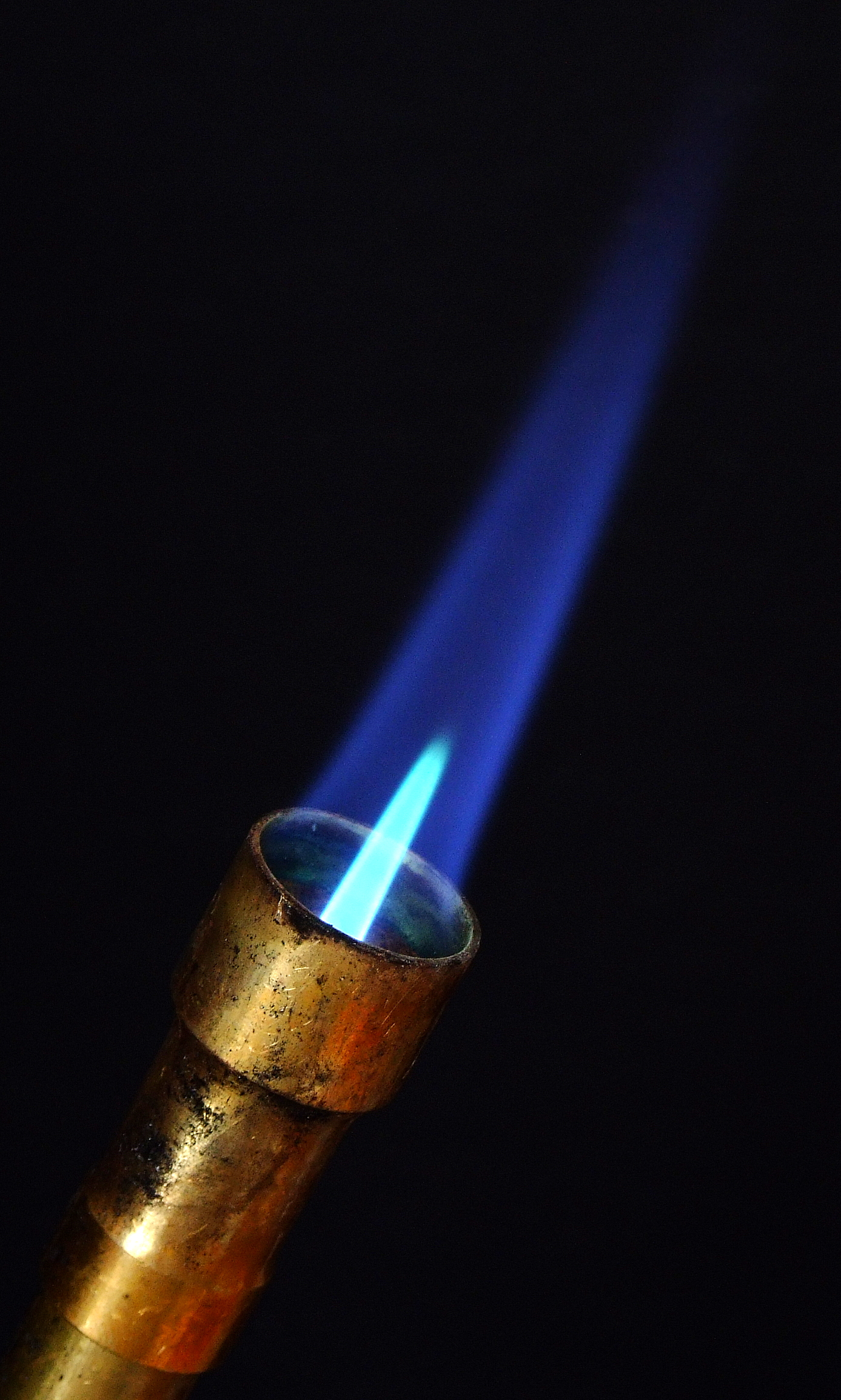
Flame from fuel premixed with air

Flame treatment is a method where exothermic reactions between oxygen and fuel gas create thermally activated radical atoms and molecules, such as atomic oxygen (O), hydroxyl (OH), imidogen (NH), Nitric oxide (NO), and cyanide (CN). The most used gases in flame treatment are propane (C_{3}H_{8}), natural gas or methane (CH_{4}), and butane (C_{4}H_{10}). These gases burn with atmospheric oxygen, producing water and carbon dioxide.

The flame has three zones; the precombustion zone (the blue outer cone), the main reaction zone (the dark blue middle cone), and the post-combustion zone (the light blue inner cone). The precombustion area is the coolest part of the flame because the amount of released energy (heat) is low. The main reaction zone is used for the surface treatment because this zone has the highest temperature and number of oxidizing agents. The flame reaches its highest temperature (1900–2000 °C) when all the propane has reacted with the air. The concentration of oxidizing agents reaches the maximum just before the post-combustion zone.

To treat a surface quickly and evenly, many gas jets, similar to the one on the right, are lined up in a long row on a single burner. The material being treated is quickly passed directly in front of or under the inner cones. The surface is in contact with the flame for less than a second. The surface is treated quickly, without time for the material to melt.

The reactive chemical species in the gas flame break the long-chain molecules in the plastic material, and attach themselves to the break points, resulting in polar point charges on the surface. On a microscopic scale, the surface also becomes rougher.

== See also ==
- Chemistry of pressure-sensitive adhesives
- Plasma activation
- Corona treatment
- Polymeric surface
- Stone flaming
- Surface finishing
