= SSIES =

SSIES, or the Special Sensors-Ions, Electrons, and Scintillation thermal plasma analysis package is a suite of instruments built by the William B. Hanson center for Space Sciences at the University of Texas at Dallas and flown on a number of the DMSP satellites. SSIESS includes a Retarding Potential Analyzer (RPA), and Ion Drift meter (IDM), a scintillation meter, and a Langmuir probe.
