= ASTM E1714 =

ASTM E1714 is a Standard Guide for Properties of a Universal Healthcare Identifier (UHID). This standard was created by the Association for Information and Image Management and ASTM International.

It defines thirty characteristics required of a UHID. The scope of the guide does not include implementation methodology, cost, or policy decisions. Encrypted UHIDs (EUHIDs) are included in the guide for hiding the identity of individuals while linking information. Separate EUHIDs are allowed for different episodes of care for the same patient. The guide also recommends the use of temporary patient identifiers (TPIs) controlled by individual organizations for emergency use and requires them to subsequently transfer all information to the correct UHID.

== Functional characteristics ==
Accessible: Access is dependent upon the establishment of a network infrastructure, the trusted authority and policies and procedures that support the system.

Assignable: Assignment of the Sample UHID or EUHID, regardless of time or place of request, depends on the establishment and functions of a network infrastructure, the trusted authority, and the implementation of policies and procedures that support the system. It will also depend on the mechanism to request a Sample UHID.

Identifiable: This will depend on the identification information that the trusted authority links to the Sample UHID.

Verifiable: The Sample UHID includes a six digit check-digit for verification.

Mergeable: The internal data structure of the Sample UHID does not directly support merging duplicate or redundant identifiers. They can be linked at the trusted authority.

Splittable: There is no inherent support for splitting the Sample UHID. New IDs can be issued for future use. Splitting for retroactive information must be handled by the trusted authority.

== Linkage of lifelong health record ==
Linkable: The Sample UHID has the ability to function as a data element and support the linkage of health records in both manual and automated environments.

Mappable: With the use of appropriate database system and software, the Sample UHID can be used to map currently existing healthcare identifiers.

== Patient confidentiality and access security ==
Content Free: The Sample UHID is free of information about the individual.

Controllable: This depends on the policies and methods that will be adopted by the trusted authority.

Healthcare Focused: The Sample UHID is recommended solely for the purpose of healthcare application.

Secure: The Sample UHID includes an EUHID which offers mechanism for secure operation through the use of encryption and decryption processes. These capabilities depend on the policies and procedures that will be implemented by the trusted authority.

Dissidentifiable: EUHID supports multiple encryption schemes offering multiple EUHIDs to prevent revealing the identification of the individual.

Public: The EUHID's encryption scheme is intended to hide the identity of individual when linking information. However, public disclosure of a patient identifier without any risk to the privacy and confidentiality of patient information depends on appropriate access security and privacy legislation, similar to other identifiers.

== Compatibility with standards and technology ==
Based on Industry Standards: The Sample UHID is not based on existing industry standards. It is based on ASTM's Standard Guide for Properties of a Universal Healthcare Identifier (UHID).

Deployable: The Sample UHID is capable of implementation in a variety of technologies such as scanners, bar code readers, etc.

Usable: The Sample UHID is capable of implementation in a variety of technologies such as scanners, bar code readers, etc. The 28 digit identifier will present difficulty for manual computation and transcription. It may be a time-consuming process and subject to human errors.

== Design characteristics ==
The ASTM guide and the proposed Sample UHID do not address the implementation issues and infrastructure requirements.

Unique: The trusted authority will be responsible for the uniqueness of the Sample UHID.

Repository-based: The Sample UHID can be stored in a repository.

Atomic: The Sample UHID consists of a sixteen digit sequential identifier, a one character delimiter, a six digit check-digit and a six digit encryption scheme. It can function as a single compound data element.

Concise: The Sample UHID is not concise. It is a 29-character length identifier.

Unambiguous: The Sample UHID is unambiguous. It uses numeric characters and a period as a delimiter.

Permanent: The Sample UHID has sufficient capacity to prevent reuse of identifiers.

Centrally governed: This policy issue is not addressed. The Sample UHID requires central administration and is dependent on the establishment and functions of a trusted authority.

Networked: The Sample UHID can be operated on a computer network. It requires establishment of the necessary network and technology infrastructure.

Longevity: The Sample UHID can support patient identification for a foreseeable future.

Retroactive: Has the capacity for retroactive assignment of the Sample UHID to every person in the United States

Universal: Can support patient identification for the entire world population

Incremental Implementation: The Sample UHID can be implemented on an incremental basis. With the development and use of appropriate procedures and establishment of the necessary bidirectional mapping, both the Sample UHID and existing patient identifiers can co-exist during the time of transition.

== Reduction of cost and enhanced health status ==
Cost-effectiveness: The Sample UHID has the potential to support the functions of a Unique Patient Identifier. The establishment of both the administrative and technology infrastructures, the creation of a Trusted Authority, the design and development of computer software, hardware and communication networks, and the implementation security measures will require substantial investment of resources, time and effort.
