= Heat torch =

A heat torch is a tool or device that is used to heat up a substance quickly, whether it is air, metal, plastic, or other materials. Heat torches typically provide a way to quickly heat a concentrated area of material for uses such as molding, metallurgy, hardening, and solidification.

== Uses ==
=== Medical industry ===
Heat torches can be found in various medical instruments such as blood analyzers. In one application, a heat torch was installed inside a blood analyzer to make film cuvettes in real time, allowing blood to be stored and tested on board the instrument.

=== Jewelry making (lapidary) ===
Commonly referred to as a soldering torch, heat torches used in jewelry making are often fueled by butane, propane, MAPP gas, or a mixture of propane and oxygen. Heat torches are more effective at working with certain metals, such as sterling, gold, and copper, because they are able to heat these metals to a higher degree than traditional soldering irons and soldering guns.

=== Manufacturing and industry ===
Heat torches have a wide range of use in manufacturing industries such as high-capacity staking, curing, drying, heat-shrinking, air heaters, sterilization, adhesive activation, air scrubbing and air knives.

=== Construction ===
Specialized plasma heat torches can be used in construction to heat up soil, a technique that has proven to be useful for providing more solid footing for buildings and structures. This is still a developing technology, but has proven to be successful in prototype testing.

== See also ==
- Blow torch
