= Strahl (surname) =

Strahl is a surname. Notable people with the surname include:

- Chuck Strahl (1957–2024), Canadian politician
- Erwin Strahl (1929–2011), Austrian actor
- Mark Strahl (born 1978), Canadian politician
- Otho F. Strahl (1831–1864), American soldier
- Rudi Strahl (1931–2001), German playwright, novelist and poet
