= SEAgel =

Type of aerogel

- Material type: Aerogel

Physical properties
- Density (ρ): 200 mg/cm^{3}

SEAgel (Safe Emulsion Agar gel) is one of a class of high-tech foam materials known as aerogels. It is an excellent thermal insulator and among the least dense solids known. SEAgel was invented by Robert Morrison at the Lawrence Livermore National Laboratory in 1992. SEAgel is made of agar, a carbohydrate material that comes from kelp and red algae, and has a density of 200 mg/cm^{3}. SEAgel can be made lighter than air using hydrogen, causing it to float or hang in the air. It insulates against temperature, noise, and electric current. SEAgel is also completely biodegradable, as it is made entirely of biological material and can even be eaten.

Initially, SEAgel starts out as a gelatin-like mixture of agar and water. After it is freeze-dried to remove the water, it is left as a honeycomb of dried agar filled with air, with cell sizes two to three micrometers (2–3 μm) in diameter.

SEAgel can have many different uses. Laboratory scientists use SEAgel as targets for X-ray laser experiments because it can be doped with other materials, such as selenium. In order to eliminate the volatile hydrodynamics that occur when a solid-density target explodes before it reaches the density required for lasing, scientists are trying to develop an X-ray laser target with a density that is less than the critical density of laser light (4×10^{21} electrons/cm^{3} for 0.53-μm light). SEAgel can help them achieve a more uniform plasma, which will ultimately improve the quality of the X-ray laser beam.

SEAgel could also be used as food packaging or the encapsulating material of timed-release medical pills, as it is safe to digest. SEAgel could also replace balsa wood, to insulate supertankers, and to provide sound damping in high-speed trains.

SEAgel was covered under U.S. patents 5,382,285 ("Biofoam") and 5,360,828 ("Biofoam II").
