= Colored-particle-in-cell =

Non-abelian particle-in-a-cell simulation

A particle in cell simulation for non-Abelian (colored) particles and fields. Can be used to simulate an equilibrium or non-equilibrium quark-gluon plasma.
