= Nanoscale plasmonic motor =

A nanoscale plasmonic motor (sometimes called a "light mill") is a type of nanomotor, converting light energy to rotational motion at nanoscale. It is constructed from pieces of gold sheet in a gammadion shape, embedded within layers of silica. When irradiated with light from a laser, the gold pieces rotate. The functioning is explained by the quantum concept of the plasmon. This type of nanomotor is much smaller than other types, and its operation can be controlled by varying the frequency of the incident light.

A working demonstration model has been produced by researchers with the Lawrence Berkeley National Laboratory and the University of California, Berkeley. Likely further developments include improving strength and flexibility, and identifying lower-cost materials. Applications envisaged include unwinding the DNA of living cells, and efficiently making use of solar energy.

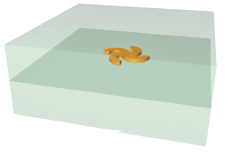
Nanometre-scale plasmonic motor. Illustration of the nano-sized gold motor, sandwiched between two identical 300 nm-thick square-shaped silica microdisks with an area of 2.2×2.2 mm.

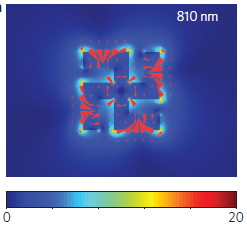
Rotation characteristic and optical properties of the motors. Rotation characteristic and optical properties of the motors. The colour map shows the normalized electric field distribution, and the red arrows indicate the Poynting flux, which is proportional to the linear momentum of light in the vicinity of the motor. The Poynting flux is scattered/absorbed at the outer side of the arms, inducing a torque on the motor to drive it anticlockwise.

== Introduction ==
The increased demands in microtechnology and nanotechnology has been triggering the vast interests and opportunities for the developments of various micro- (MEMS) and nano-(NEMS) mechanical system based products. One of the features of this technology is its unique ability to imitate various natural phenomena. For example, biomedical engineering has succeeded to replace and increase the function of damaged or diseased organs, by designing the artificial ones using the nanoscale approach. The science behind the nanotechnology help them to design devices used for transplantation in medicine, suggesting that one should understand how nanoscale devices work by exploring living cells and its working principles. It could certainly inspire the ideas behind the design of powerful devices. Mechanism of auto-regeneration of energy by microorganisms has drawn attention to understand how energy can be generated from nanomaterials.

As demonstrated in the works of various researchers, nanotechnology has a great ability to power and improve several natural biological devices by replacing those entities and mimicking natural processes within the living being. The primary concern behind such an approach is to provide an alternative source with higher ability under a controlled environment. One of the breakthrough discoveries among them is the nanomotor, a tiny device which has the ability to convert various forms of energy into motion using approaches observed in nature. The discovery in this field explains the use of wave and particle properties together to make the nanomotor work. This leads to observation of the so-called plasmonic nanomotor using the properties of plasmon to make the nanomotor work. Researchers with the U.S. Department of Energy (DOE)'s Lawrence Berkeley National Laboratory and the University of California (UC) Berkeley have created the first nano-sized light mill motor whose rotational speed and direction can be controlled by tuning the frequency of the incident light waves.

== Background ==
Nanomotors are broadly classified into biological, hybrid and non-biological ones. Biological nanomotors are typically the microscopic engines created by the nature like the bacterial flagella which can come into motion by using ATP synthase, produced within the cell. This motor allows the bacterial to move independently. The man made counterpart is called a non-biological nanomotor and mimics the function of natural or biological nanomotor to allow the devices to work. However, these man-made nanodevices are less efficient compared to the biological counterpart. They require certain functionalization to accelerate movement or to improve the functions of the artificial nanomotor. For instance incorporation of carbon nanotube into platinum component of asymmetric metal nanowire leads to its dramatically accelerated movement in hydrogen peroxide solution. The hybrid nanomotor uses the chemical principle which are regularly observed in the biological nanomotor and other principles like magnetic interactions to perform their functions.

The motion of a nanomotor could result from optical, electrical, magnetic or chemical interactions. These principles are applied according to the scale of the materials we are dealing with. One of the breakthrough reports on nanomotor is the possibility to use energy from the quantum behavior of photons to induce motion in the devices, where the authors were able to induce and control rotation, velocity and directions of nanosized gold (motor) within silica microdisk. This relevant report pointed out that velocity, direction and rotation were strongly dependent on the nature of light (wavelength) impinging upon the motor.

== Working principle ==
Mostly photons exhibit linear momentum as well as angular momentum. These properties attribute towards different phenomena like induction of mechanical torque, optical trapping and cooling both in macro scale and nanoscale observations.

Plasmon is the resonant mode that involves the interaction between free charges and light. In a metallic nanostructure, when the applied electric field is resonant with its plasmons, the interaction between light and matter can be greatly enhanced. Free electrons in metals can be driven by the interaction of these plasmon waves of metals and the electric field, generated by the incident light. This phenomenon also modifies the light by influencing its electric and magnetic field. The whole process induces the optical torque which can give a motion to the metallic nanostructures.

== Experimental configuration ==
Based on the plasmonic concept, Liu and coworker demonstrated the plasmonic motor at nanoscale. The gammadion-shaped nanostructures were made up of Gold (size ~ 190x 190 nm) which were symmetrically sandwiched between two Silicon dioxide layers. The whole system was fabricated by using standard electron beam lithography. When the system is illuminated with linearly polarized light, it produces a torque which drives these tiny nanostructures, called "plasmonic nanomotors". The imposed torque results solely from the gammadion structure’s symmetry and interaction with the incident light. These nanomotors seems to change their directions of motions (clockwise and anticlockwise) according to the wavelength (longer and shorter) of the incident laser beam.

== Applications ==
Because of its size and driven energy, the nanoscale plasmonic motor could provide rotational force at nanoscale, which would be widely used in energy conversion and biology.

=== In biology ===
The structural dynamics of cellular processes such as replication and transcription could determine the mechanical properties of DNA. However, the effect of torque should be considered when measuring DNA mechanics. Under low tension, DNA behaves like an isotropic flexible rod; whereas at higher tensions, the behaviour of over- and underwound molecules differs. When the nanoscale plasmonic motor is used, torsional stress will build up in the molecule by holding the rotor bead stationary using fluid flow. Through observing the twist angle of DNA, the elastic properties of DNA could be obtained.

The newly developed light-driven nanoscale motor could address the limitations of the earlier light mills. It generates comparable torque, which was made of gold and had much smaller size. At 100 nanometers (one-tenth the size of other motors) it would make possible applications like unwinding DNA in living cells. While the system is under controlled winding and unwinding of DNA, the small motor could be illuminated at different wavelengths for in vivo manipulation.

=== In energy conversion ===
The microelectromechanical system is different from the traditional electromechanical system. For the nanoscale plasmonic motor, it could harvest light energy through rotating microscopic-scale objects. In addition, a nanoscale plasmonic motor could link transduction mechanisms in series (e.g., convert a thermal signal first into a mechanical signal, then into an optical signal, and finally into an electrical signal).

So these motors could apply to solar light harvesting in nanoscopic systems through designing multiple motors to work at different resonance frequencies and single directions. And such multiple motor structures could be used to acquire torque from a broad wavelength range instead of a single frequency.

== Limitations ==
In the past, nanoparticles were rotated by exploiting the incident intrinsic movement of the light, but it is the first time to induce the rotation of a nanoparticle without exploiting the intrinsic angular momentum of light.

Because the nanoscale plasmonic motor is a new technology, several problems are faced, such as the price of higher development costs, greater complexity and a longer development time and the workhorse methods and materials of nanometre-scale electromechanical system (NEMS) technology are not universally well suited to the nanoscale. The nanoscale plasmonic motor also has limitations in strength and flexibility.

== Future plans ==
In the future, scientists will pay more attention to synthesis, the efficiency of the light mills. Alternative materials for motors also will be developed as substitutes for the expensive materials - such as gold, silicon, carbon nanotube - used in the experimental stage. The strength and flexibility of nanoscale plasmonic motors will also be improved.

== See also ==
- Plasmonic nanorod motors
- Nanomotor
