= Carbon nanotube metal matrix composite =

Carbon nanotube metal matrix composites (CNT-MMC) are an emerging class of new materials that mix carbon nanotubes into metals and metal alloys to take advantage of the high tensile strength and electrical conductivity of carbon nanotube materials.

== Carbon nanotubes reinforced metal matrix composites production methods ==
CNT-MMCs may be produced in several different methods. These production methods include, but are not limited to, various powder metallurgy techniques such as hot pressing, hot extrusion, semisolid powder processing, thermal spraying, sputtering, physical vapor deposition, and pulsed laser deposition.

=== Powder metallurgy techniques ===
Conventional sintering is the simplest method for producing CNT metal matrix composite compacts. The CNTs and metal powders are mixed by a process of mechanical alloying/blending and then are compressed to form a green compact, which is then sintered to get the final product. Metallic compacts are subject to oxidation as compared to ceramics and hence the sintering has to be done in an inert atmosphere or under vacuum. One major drawback of this processing route is the inability to tailor the CNT distribution within the metallic matrix.

Microwave sintering is one of them and fundamentally different from conventional sintering. In microwave sintering process, the material is heated internally and volumetrically unlike in a conventional process where heat originates from an external heating source. Sintering cycle time for microwave sintering is much shorter as compared with the conventional sintering cycle.

Spark plasma sintering is a technique which takes only a few minutes to complete a sintering process compared to conventional sintering which may take hours or even days for the same. High sintering rate is possible in SPS since high heating rates can be easily attained due to internal heating of the sample as opposed to external heating seen in case of conventional sintering. For conventional sintering usually a green compact needs to be prepared externally using a suitable die and hydraulic machine for applying the necessary pressure. In SPS the powder is directly fed into the graphite dies and the die is enclosed with suitable punches. All types of materials, even those difficult to densify can be easily sintered in SPS. Due to advantage of high heating rate and less holding time, SPS can restrict the unwanted sintering reactions in highly reactive systems as opposed to conventional sintering and hence formation of undesirable product phases can be avoided.

Semi-solid powder processing is a unique method that fabricates composites materials with powder mixtures in the semi-solid states. Starting with metal-CNT powder mixture, the metal powder is heated to the semi-solid state, and pressure is applied to form the metal matrix composites. This method features many advantages such as simple and fast process and flexible property tailoring.

=== Carbon nanotube dispersing and CNT breakage during mixing ===
One common method to disperse the CNT into the metal matrix is mechanical alloying. However, many researchers reported the length reduction and damage of CNTs during mechanical alloying process.
