= Plasma antenna =

Type of radio antenna

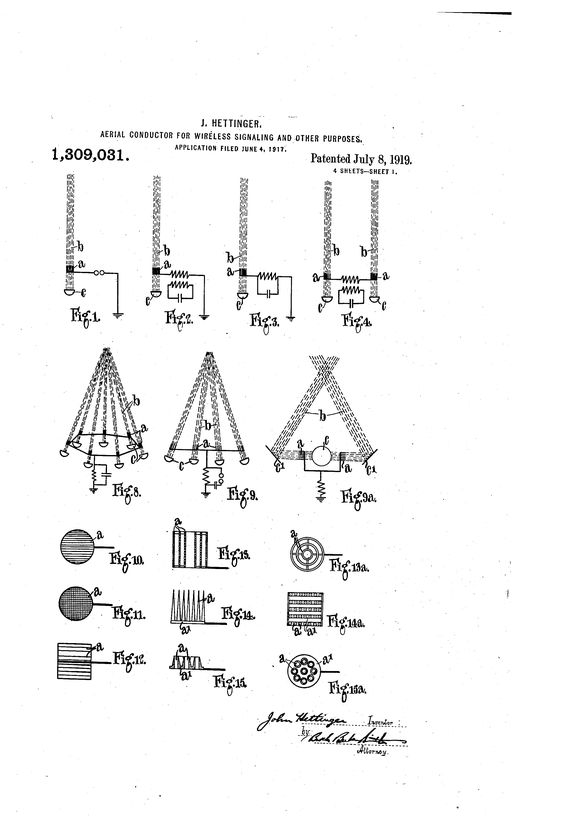
Hettinger's Aerial Conductors for Wireless Signaling US1309031A

A plasma antenna is a type of radio antenna currently in development in which plasma is used instead of the metal elements of a traditional antenna. A plasma antenna can be used for both transmission and reception. Although plasma antennas have only become practical in recent years, the idea is not new; a patent for an antenna using the concept was granted to J. Hettinger in 1919.

Early practical examples of the technology used discharge tubes to contain the plasma and are referred to as ionized gas plasma antennas. Ionized gas plasma antennas can be turned on and off and are good for stealth and resistance to electronic warfare and cyber attacks. Ionized gas plasma antennas can be nested such that the higher frequency plasma antennas are placed inside lower frequency plasma antennas. Higher frequency ionized gas plasma antenna arrays can transmit and receive through lower frequency ionized gas plasma antenna arrays. This means that the ionized gas plasma antennas can be co-located and ionized gas plasma antenna arrays can be stacked. Ionized gas plasma antennas can eliminate or reduce co-site interference. Smart ionized gas plasma antennas use plasma physics to shape and steer the antenna beams without the need of phased arrays. Satellite signals can be steered or focused in the reflective or refractive modes using banks of plasma tubes making unique ionized gas satellite plasma antennas. The thermal noise of ionized gas plasma antennas is less than in the corresponding metal antennas at the higher frequencies. Solid state plasma antennas (also known as plasma silicon antennas) with steerable directional functionality that can be manufactured using standard silicon chip fabrication techniques are now also in development. Plasma silicon antennas are candidates for use in WiGig (the planned enhancement to Wi-Fi), and have other potential applications, for example in reducing the cost of vehicle-mounted radar collision avoidance systems.

== Operation ==
In an ionized gas plasma antenna, a gas is ionized to create a plasma. Unlike gases, plasmas have very high electrical conductivity so it is possible for radio frequency signals to travel through them so that they act as a driven element (such as a dipole antenna) to radiate radio waves, or to receive them. Alternatively the plasma can be used as a reflector or a lens to guide and focus radio waves from another source.

Solid-state antennas differ in that the plasma is created from electrons generated by activating thousands of diodes on a silicon chip.

== Advantages ==
Plasma antennas possess a number of advantages over metal antennas, including:

- As soon as the plasma generator is switched off, the plasma returns to a non conductive gas and therefore becomes effectively invisible to radar.
- They can be dynamically tuned and reconfigured for frequency, direction, bandwidth, gain and beamwidth, so replacing the need for multiple antennas.
- They are resistant to electronic warfare.
- At satellite frequencies, they exhibit much less thermal noise and are capable of faster data rates.
