= Two-dimensional point vortex gas =

The two-dimensional point vortex gas is a discrete particle model used to study turbulence in two-dimensional ideal fluids. The two-dimensional guiding-center plasma is a completely equivalent model used in plasma physics.

== General setup ==
The model is a Hamiltonian system of N points in the two-dimensional plane executing the motion

$$k_i\frac{dx_i}{dt} = \frac{\partial H}{\partial y_i},\qquad k_i\frac{dy_i}{dt} = -\frac{\partial H}{\partial x_i},$$

(In the confined version of the problem, the logarithmic potential is modified.)

== Interpretations ==
In the point-vortex gas interpretation, the particles represent either point vortices in a two-dimensional fluid, or parallel line vortices in a three-dimensional fluid. The constant k_{i} is the circulation of the fluid around the ith vortex. The Hamiltonian H is the interaction term of the fluid's integrated kinetic energy; it may be either positive or negative. The equations of motion simply reflect the drift of each vortex's position in the velocity field of the other vortices.

In the guiding-center plasma interpretation, the particles represent long filaments of charge parallel to some external magnetic field. The constant k_{i} is the linear charge density of the ith filament. The Hamiltonian H is just the two-dimensional Coulomb potential between lines. The equations of motion reflect the guiding center drift of the charge filaments, hence the name.
