= Ecton (physics) =

Ectons are explosive electron emissions observed as individual packets or avalanches of electrons, occurring as microexplosions at the cathode. The electron current in an ecton starts flowing as a result of overheating of the metal cathode because of the high energy density (10^{4}Jg^{−1}), and stops when the emission zone cools off.

Ectons occur in plasma-involving phenomena, such as: electrical discharges in vacuum, cathode spots of vacuum arcs, volumetric discharges in gases, pseudo-spark discharges, coronas, unipolar arcs, etc.

An ecton consists of individual portions of electrons (10^{11}– 10^{12} particles). The formation time is of the order of nanoseconds.
