= Strahl (astronomy) =

Strahl, from the German for "ray" or "beam" such as radiation is, is the electron component of the solar wind that is the most closely aligned with the magnetic field of the Sun. These electrons are part of the high-speed component of the solar wind and have sufficient velocity to escape from the electrostatic potential of the Sun. They carry the electron heat flux of the solar wind and always move away from the Sun along the magnetic field lines. Strahl are distinguished from the 'core' and 'halo' populations of electrons, which form part of the low- and high-speed solar wind and are normally anisotropic with respect to the Sun's magnetic field.

Electrons precipitating into the polar regions of the Sun form the source of the strahl. When the magnetic lines of force are connected with the interplanetary magnetic field (IMF) in the appropriate direction, the strahl electrons are transported from the solar corona with energies of up to several hundred eV. When the Sun's magnetic field lines are not connected with the IMF, the strahl effect is blocked at that pole.
