= U-HID =

Type of lamp

U-HID (Ultra High Intensity Discharge) is a type of lamp. A mixture of two physical principles in lighting electronics, U-HID is the combination of Plasma and High Intensity Discharge (HID) technologies. The U-HID lamp produces a beam of light due to the formation of a plasma discharge arc. Its tube is made of a sphere of transparent quartz or ceramic filled with a special inactive high pressure gas. Through the plasma formation in its core, the atoms outside the chamber produce light. At the beginning of the plasma formation, a blue color at the tips of the inner glass insulation can be seen. This can be considered a characteristic of the technology.

U-HID lamp uses a high voltage pulse discharge that does not dissipate the plasma produced. The brilliance of a U-HID lamp can reach 80% in four seconds under normal temperature conditions, and can start working at 100% instantly after a re-ignition. Comparatively, the intensity of light from a U-HID lamp is at least three times stronger than a metal halide HID lamp in a color range of 4200K (cold light).

U-HID is an abbreviation for a commercial USB circuit board meant to replace a USB keyboard on a PC. It is called a Universal Human Interface Device.
