= Plasma processing =

Plasma processing is a plasma-based material processing technology that aims at modifying the chemical and physical properties of a surface.

Plasma processing techniques include:

- Plasma activation
- Plasma ashing
- Plasma cleaning
- Plasma electrolytic oxidation
- Plasma etching
- Plasma functionalization
- Plasma polymerization
- Corona treatment
- Plasma modification

Related topics are plasma chemistry, chemical vapor deposition, and physical vapor deposition processes like sputter deposition, plasma iondoping, vacuum plasmaspraying, and reactive ion etching.
