= Flowing-afterglow mass spectrometry =

Flowing-afterglow mass spectrometry (FA-MS), is an analytical chemistry technique for the sensitive detection of trace gases. Trace gas molecules are ionized by the production and flow of thermalized hydrated hydronium cluster ions in a plasma afterglow of helium or argon carrier gas along a flow tube following the introduction of a humid air sample. These ions react in multiple collisions with water molecules, their isotopic compositions reach equilibrium and the relative magnitudes of their isotopomers are measured by mass spectrometry.

== Brief history ==
Over the years many variations of the instrument have been made. In the beginning during the 1960s there was the study of flowing afterglow plasma. This study was done by Eldon Ferguson, Art Schmeltekopf and Fred Fehsenfeld at National Bureau of Standards in Boulder, Colorado. Then in the 1970s it was flowing drift tube, flowing afterglow Langmuir probe (FALP), and variable temperature flowing afterglow Langmuir probe (VT-FALP). With the addition of the drift tube the kinetics of a reaction could be studied in the gas phase. With the flowing afterglow Langmuir probe the electron density within the reaction region of the drift tube can be studied. With the VT-FALP version of flowing afterglow the reactions temperature dependence could be studied. Now in the 2000s the ambient version of flowing afterglow mass spectrometry is flowing atmospheric pressure afterglow mass spectrometry (FAPA-MS).The FAPA allows for simple or no sample preparations but the humidity of the instrument's environment may have an effect on a sample fragmentation pattern. Since the cost of helium is steady rising some have started to use alternative methods with ambient flowing afterglow to conserve resources. Instead of using continuously flowing afterglow helium some use interrupted helium flow to conserve gas and Schlieren imaging to maximize the molecular ions produced and the instrument step-up.

== Application(s) ==
=== Trace gas analysis ===
One of the first papers reporting the use of the flowing afterglow studied ion-molecule reactions pertinent to the Martian atmosphere. This flowing afterglow technique replaced the then standard stationary afterglow when the movable Langmuir probe was introduced. The flowing afterglow has many attractive aspects: well-understood laminar behavior, viscous gas flow, a large density of carrier gas which allows the study of thermalized reactions, and the capability to make new reactant ions in situ. The ambipolar plasma is sampled using a nosecone and detected using conventional quadrupole or tandem mass spectrometry, depending on the application. One of the drawbacks of the flowing afterglow technique is the possibility of generating multiple reactant ions. This problem is circumvented by implementing the selected ion flow tube (SIFT).

The flowing afterglow technique can be used to identify and quantify the volatile organic compounds (VOCs) of a sample as long as the fundamental ion chemistry is known. The commonly used ions are H_{3}O^{+}, O_{2}^{+*}, and NO^{+}. All ions have drawbacks and advantages. Strategies that have been employed to identify the VOCs include using gas chromatography coupled with flowing afterglow and using a complement of reagent ions. Also in addition to being able to detect volatile organic compounds, the flowing afterglow technique has also been used to study chronic kidney disease. Studies have been done to create a spectrum of deuterium water and its isotopes to measure total body water, which can be used to determine the water body overload of a patient. That measurement will then be used to determine the stage of renal failure for a patient.

== See also ==
- Charles H. DePuy (chemist)
- Robert R. Squires
