= Microelectromechanical system oscillator =

Timing oscillator

Microelectromechanical system oscillators (MEMS oscillators) are devices that generate highly stable reference frequencies used to sequence electronic systems, manage data transfer, define radio frequencies, and measure elapsed time. The core technologies used in MEMS oscillators have been in development since the mid-1960s, but have only been sufficiently advanced for commercial applications since 2006. MEMS oscillators incorporate MEMS resonators, which are microelectromechanical structures that define stable frequencies. MEMS clock generators are MEMS timing devices with multiple outputs for systems that need more than a single reference frequency. MEMS oscillators are a valid alternative to older, more established quartz crystal oscillators, offering better resilience against vibration and mechanical shock, and reliability with respect to temperature variation.

== MEMS timing devices ==
=== Resonators ===
MEMS resonators are small electromechanical structures that vibrate at high frequencies. They are used for timing references, signal filtering, mass sensing, biological sensing, motion sensing, and other diverse applications.

For frequency and timing references, MEMS resonators are attached to electronic circuits, often called sustaining amplifiers, to drive them in continuous motion. In most cases these circuits are located near the resonators and in the same physical package. In addition to driving the resonators, these circuits produce output signals for downstream electronics.

=== Oscillators ===
By convention, the term oscillators usually denotes integrated circuits (ICs) that supply single output frequencies. MEMS oscillators include MEMS resonators, sustaining amps, and additional electronics to set or adjust their output frequencies. These circuits often include phase-locked loops (PLLs) that produce selectable or programmable output frequencies from the upstream MEMS reference frequencies.

MEMS oscillators are commonly available as 4- or 6-pin ICs that conform to printed circuit board (PCB) solder footprints previously standardized for quartz crystal oscillators.

=== Clock generators ===
The term clock generator usually denotes a timing IC with multiple outputs. Following this custom, MEMS clock generators are multi-output MEMS timing devices. These are used to supply timing signals in complex electronic systems that require multiple frequencies or clock phases. For example, most computers require independent clocks for processor timing, disk I/O, serial I/O, video generation, Ethernet I/O, audio conversion, and other functions.

Clock generators are usually specialised for their applications, including the number and selection of frequencies, various auxiliary features, and package configurations. They often include multiple PLLs to generate multiple output frequencies or phases.

=== Real-time clocks ===
MEMS Real-time clocks (RTCs) are ICs that track time of day and date. They include MEMS resonators, sustaining amps, and registers that increment with time, for instance counting days, hours, minutes and seconds. They also include auxiliary functions like alarm outputs and battery management.

RTCs must run continuously to keep track of elapsed time. To do this they must sometimes run from small batteries and therefore must operate at very low power levels. They are generally moderate-sized ICs with up to 20 pins for power, battery backup, digital interface, and various other functions.

== History of MEMS timing devices ==
=== First demonstration ===
Motivated by the shortcomings of quartz crystal oscillators, researchers have been developing the resonance properties of MEMS structures since 1965. However, until recently various accuracy, stability, and manufacturability issues related to sealing, packaging, and adjusting the resonator elements prevented cost-effective commercial manufacturing. Five technical challenges had to be overcome:

- First demonstrations
- Finding stable and predictable resonator materials,
- Developing sufficiently clean hermetic packaging technologies,
- Trimming and compensating the output frequencies, increasing the quality factor of the resonator elements, and
- Improving the signal integrity to meet various application requirements.

The first MEMS resonators were built with metallic resonator elements. These resonators were envisioned as audio filters and had moderate quality factors (Qs) of 500 and frequencies of 1 kHz to 100 kHz. Filtering applications, now for high frequency radio, are still important and are an active area for MEMS research and commercial products.

However, early MEMS resonators did not have sufficiently stable frequencies to be used for timing references or clock generation. The metallic resonator elements tended to shift frequency with time (they aged) and with use (they fatigued). Under temperature variation they tended to have large and not entirely predictable frequency shifts (they had large temperature sensitivity) and when they were temperature cycled they tended to return to different frequencies (they were hysteretic).

=== Material development ===
Work in the 1970s through the 1990s identified sufficiently stable resonator materials and associated fabrication techniques. In particular, single and polycrystalline silicon was found to be suitable for frequency references with effectively zero aging, fatigue and hysteresis, and with moderate temperature sensitivity.

Material development is still ongoing in MEMS resonator research. Significant effort has been invested in silicon-germanium (SiGe) for its low temperature fabrication and aluminium nitride (AlN) for its piezoelectric transduction. Work on micromachined quartz continues, while polycrystalline diamond has been used for high frequency resonators for its exceptional stiffness-to-mass ratio.

=== Packaging development ===
MEMS resonators require cavities in which they can move freely, and for frequency references these cavities must be evacuated. Early resonators were built on top of silicon wafers and tested in vacuum chambers, but individual resonator encapsulation was clearly needed.

The MEMS community had employed bonded cover techniques to enclose other MEMS components, for instance pressure sensors, accelerometers, and gyroscopes, and these techniques were adapted to resonators. In this approach, cover wafers were micromachined with small cavities and bonded to the resonator wafers, enclosing the resonators in small evacuated cavities. Initially these wafers were bonded with low melting temperature glass, called glass frit, but recently other bonding technologies including metallic compression and metallic amalgams, have replaced glass frit.

Thin film encapsulation techniques were developed to form enclosed cavities by building covers directly over the resonators in the fabrication process rather than bonding covers onto the resonators. These techniques had the advantage that they did not use as much die area for the sealing structure, they did not require preparation of second wafers to form the covers, and the resulting device wafers were thinner.

Frequency references generally require frequency stabilities of 100 parts per million (ppm) or better. However, the early cover and encapsulation technologies left significant amounts of contamination in the cavities. Because MEMS resonators are small, and particularly because they have small volume-to-surface area, they are especially sensitive to mass loading. Even single-atomic layers of contaminants like water or hydrocarbons can shift the resonator's frequencies out of specification.

When resonators are aged or temperature cycled, the contaminants can move in the chambers, and transfer onto or off of the resonators. The change in mass on the resonators can produce hysteresis of thousands of ppm, which is unacceptable for virtually all frequency reference applications.

Early covered resonators with glass frit seals were unstable because contaminants outgassed from the sealing material. To overcome this, getters were built into the cavities. Getters are materials that can absorb gas and contaminants after cavities are sealed. However, getters can also release contaminants and can be costly, so their use in this application is being discontinued in favor of cleaner cover bonding processes.

Likewise, thin film encapsulation can trap fabrication byproducts in the cavities. A high temperature thin film encapsulation based on epitaxial silicon deposition was developed to eliminate this. This epitaxial sealing (EpiSeal) process has been found to be exceptionally clean and produces the highest stability resonators.

=== Electronic frequency selection and trimming ===
In early MEMS resonator development, researchers tried to build resonators at the target application frequencies and to maintain those frequencies over temperature. Approaches to solving this problem included trimming and temperature compensating the MEMS resonators in ways analogous to those used for quartz crystal.

However, these techniques were found to be technically limiting and expensive. A more effective solution was to electronically shift the resonators' frequencies to the oscillators' output frequencies. This had the advantage that the resonators did not need to be individually trimmed; instead their frequencies could be measured and appropriate scaling coefficients recorded in the oscillator ICs. In addition, the resonators' temperatures could be electronically measured, and the frequency scaling could be adjusted to compensate for the resonators' frequency variation over temperature.

=== Improving signal integrity ===
Various applications require clocks with predefined signal and performance specifications. Of these, the key specifications are phase noise and frequency stability.

Phase noise has been optimized by raising the resonator's natural frequencies (f) and quality factors (Q). The Q specifies how long resonators continue to ring after drive to them is stopped, or equivalently when viewed as filters how narrow their pass-bands are. In particular, the Q times f, or Qf product, determines the near-carrier phase noise. Early MEMS resonators showed unacceptably low Qf products for reference. Significant theoretical work clarified the underlying physics while experimental work developed high Qf resonators. The presently available MEMS Qf performance is suitable for virtually all applications.

Resonator structural design, particularly in mode control, anchoring methods, narrow-gap transducers, linearity, and arrayed structures consumed significant research effort.

The required frequency accuracies range from relatively loose for processor clocking, typically 50 to 100 ppm, to precise for high speed data clocking, often 2.5 ppm and below. Research demonstrated MEMS resonators and oscillators could be built to well within these levels. Commercial products are now available to 0.5 ppm, which covers the majority of application requirements.

Finally, the frequency control electronics and associated support circuitry needed to be developed and optimized. Key areas were in temperature sensors and PLL design. Recent circuit developments have produced MEMS oscillators suitable for high speed serial applications with sub-picosecond integrated jitter.

=== Commercialization ===
The U.S. Defense Advanced Research Projects Agency (DARPA) funded a wide range of MEMS research that provided the base technologies for the developments described above. In 2001 and 2002, DARPA launched the Nano Mechanical Array Signal Processors (NMASP) and Harsh Environment Robust Micromechanical Technology (HERMIT) programs to specifically develop MEMS high stability resonator and packaging technologies. This work was fruitful and advanced the technology to a level at which venture capital funded startups could develop commercial products. These startups included Discera in 2001, SiTime in 2004, Silicon Clocks in 2006, and Harmonic Devices in 2006.

SiTime introduced the first production MEMS oscillator in 2006, followed by Discera in 2007. Harmonic Devices changed its focus to sensor products and was bought by Qualcomm in 2010. Silicon Clocks never introduced commercial products and was bought by Silicon Labs in 2010. Additional entrants have announced their intention to produce MEMS oscillators, including Sand 9 and VTI Technologies.

By sales volume, MEMS oscillator suppliers rank in descending order as SiTime and Discera. A number of quartz oscillator suppliers resell MEMS oscillators. SiTime announced it has cumulatively shipped 50 million units as of mid-2011. Others have not disclosed sales volumes.

== Operation ==
One can think of MEMS resonators as small bells that ring at high frequencies. Small bells ring at higher frequencies than large bells, and since MEMS resonators are small they can ring at high frequencies. Common bells are meters down to centimeters across and ring at hundreds of hertz to kilohertz; MEMS resonators are a tenth of a millimeter across and ring at tens of kilohertz to hundreds of megahertz. MEMS resonators have operated at over a gigahertz.

Common bells are mechanically struck, while MEMS resonators are electrically driven. There are two base technologies used to build MEMS resonators that differ in how electrical drive and sense signals are transduced from the mechanical motion. These are electrostatic and piezoelectric. All commercial MEMS oscillators use electrostatic transduction, while MEMS filters use piezoelectric transduction. Piezoelectric resonators have not shown sufficient frequency stability or quality factor (Q) for frequency reference applications.

Electronic sustaining amps drive the resonators in continuous oscillation. These amplifiers detect the resonator motion and drive additional energy into the resonators. They are carefully designed to maintain the resonator's motion at appropriate amplitudes and to extract low noise output clock signals.

Additional circuits called fractional-n phase lock loops (frac-N PLLs) multiply the resonator's mechanical frequencies to the oscillator's output frequencies. These highly specialized PLLs set the output frequencies under control of digital state machines. The state machines are controlled by calibration and program data stored in non-volatile memory and adjust the PLL configurations to compensate for temperature variations.

The state machines can also be built to provide additional user functions, for instance, spread-spectrum clocking and voltage-controlled frequency trimming.

MEMS clock generators are built with MEMS oscillators at their core and include additional circuitry to supply the additional outputs. This additional circuitry is usually designed to provide the specific features required by the applications.

MEMS RTCs work like oscillators but are optimized for low power consumption and include auxiliary circuits to track the date and time. To operate at low power, they are built with low-frequency MEMS resonators. Care is taken in circuit design to minimize power consumption while providing the required timing accuracies.

== Manufacturing ==
=== Resonators ===
Depending upon the type of resonator, the fabrication process is either done in a specialized MEMS fab or a CMOS foundry.

The manufacturing process varies with resonator and encapsulation design, but in general, the resonator structures are lithographically patterned and plasma-etched in or on silicon wafers. All commercial MEMS oscillators are built from poly or single-crystal silicon.

It is important in electrostatically transduced resonators to form narrow and well-controlled drive and sense capacitor gaps. These can be either lateral for instance under the resonators, or vertical beside the resonators. Each option has its advantages and both are used commercially.

The resonators are encapsulated either by bonding cover wafers onto the resonator wafers or by depositing thin film encapsulation layers over the resonators. Here again, both methods are used commercially.

Bonded cover wafers must be attached with an adhesive. Two options are used: a glass frit bond ring or a metallic bond ring. The glass frit has been found to generate too much contamination and thus drift, and is no longer commonly used.

For thin film encapsulation, the resonators' structures are covered with layers of oxide and silicon, then released by removing the surrounding oxide to form freestanding resonators, and finally sealed with an additional deposition.

=== Circuitry ===
The sustaining amps, PLLs, and auxiliary circuits are built with standard mixed-signal CMOS processes fabricated in CMOS foundries.

Integrated MEMS oscillators with CMOS circuits on the same IC die have been demonstrated but to date this homogeneous integration is not commercially viable. Instead, it is advantageous to produce the MEMS resonators and CMOS circuitry on separate die and combine them at the packaging stage. Combining multiple die in a single package in this way is called heterogeneous integration or simply die stacking.

=== Packaging ===
The completed MEMS devices, enclosed in small chip-level vacuum chambers, are diced from their silicon wafers, and the resonator die are stacked on CMOS die and molded into plastic packages to form oscillators.

MEMS oscillators are packaged in the same factories and with the same equipment and materials that are used for standard IC packaging. This is a significant contributor to their cost-effectiveness and reliability as compared to quartz oscillators, which are assembled with specialized ceramic packages in custom-built factories.

Package dimensions and pad shapes match those of standard quartz oscillator packages so the MEMS oscillators can be soldered directly on PCBs designed for quartz without requiring board modification or re-design.

=== Testing and calibration ===
Production tests check and calibrate the MEMS resonators and CMOS ICs to verify they are performing to specification and trim their frequencies. In addition, many MEMS oscillators have programmable output frequencies that can be configured at test time. Of course the various types of oscillators are configured from specialized CMOS and MEMS die. For instance, low power and high performance oscillators are not built with the same die. In addition, high precision oscillators often require more careful calibration than lower precision oscillators.

MEMS oscillators are tested much like standard ICs. Like packaging, this is done in standard IC factories with standard IC test equipment.

Using standard IC packaging and test facilities (called subcons in the IC industry) gives MEMS oscillators production scalability. These facilities are capable of large production volumes, often hundreds of millions of ICs per day. This capacity is shared across many IC companies, so ramping production volumes of specific ICs, or in this case specific MEMS oscillators, is a function of allocating standard production equipment. Conversely, quartz oscillator factories are single-function in nature, so that ramping production requires installing custom equipment, which is more costly and time-consuming than allocating standard equipment.

== Comparing MEMS and quartz oscillators ==
Quartz oscillators are sold in much larger quantities than MEMS oscillators, and are widely used and understood by electronics engineers. Therefore, quartz oscillators provide the baseline from which MEMS oscillators are compared.

Recent advances have enabled MEMS-based timing devices to offer performance levels similar, and sometimes superior, to quartz devices. MEMS oscillator signal quality as measured by phase noise is now sufficient for most applications. Devices with phase noise of -159 dBc/Hz at a 10 kHz offset for a 19.2 MHz carrier frequency are now available, a level that is generally only needed for radio frequency (RF) applications. MEMS oscillators are now available with integrated jitter under 1.0 picosecond, measured from 12 kHz to 20 MHz, a level that is normally required for high speed serial data links, such as SONET and SyncE, and some instrumentation applications.

Short term stability, startup time, and power consumption, are similar to those of quartz. In some cases, MEMS oscillators show lower power consumption than that of quartz.

High precision MEMS temperature-compensated oscillators (TCXOs) have recently been announced with ±0.1 ppm frequency stability over temperature. This exceeds the performance of all but the very high-end quartz TCXOs and oven-controlled oscillators (OCXOs). MEMS TCXOs are now available with output frequencies over 100 MHz, a capability that only a few specialized quartz oscillators (e.g., inverted mesa,) can provide.

In RTC applications MEMS oscillators are performing slightly better than the best quartz tuning forks in terms of frequency stability over temperature and solder-down shift, while quartz is still superior for the lowest power applications.

Manufacturing and stocking quartz oscillators to the wide variety of specifications that users require is difficult. Various applications require oscillators with specific frequencies, accuracy levels, signal quality levels, package sizes, supply voltages, and special features. The combination of these leads to a proliferation of part numbers which makes stocking impractical and can lead to long production lead times.

MEMS oscillator suppliers solve the diversity problem by leveraging circuit technology. While quartz oscillators are usually built with the quartz crystals driven at the desired output frequencies, MEMS oscillators commonly drive the resonators at one frequency and multiply this to the designed output frequency. In this way, the hundreds of standard application frequencies and the occasional custom frequency can be provided without redesigning the MEMS resonators or circuits.

There are, of course, differences in the resonator, circuits, or calibration required for different categories of parts, but within these categories the frequency translation parameters can often be programmed into the MEMS oscillators late in the production process. Because the components are not differentiated until late in the process the lead times can be short, typically a few weeks. Technologically, quartz oscillators can be made with circuit-centric programmable architectures like those used in MEMS, but historically only a minority have been built this way.

MEMS oscillators are also significantly immune to shock and vibration and have shown production quality levels higher than those associated with quartz.

Quartz oscillators are secure in specific applications where suitable MEMS oscillators have not been introduced. One of those applications, for instance, is voltage-controlled TCXOs (VCTCXOs) for cell phone handsets. This application requires a very specific set of capabilities for which quartz products are highly optimized.

Quartz oscillators are superior in the extreme high ends of the performance range. These include OCXOs that can maintain stabilities within a few parts per billion (ppb), and surface acoustic wave (SAW) oscillators that can deliver jitter under 100 femtoseconds at high frequencies. Until recently, MEMS oscillators did not compete in the TCXO product range, but new product introductions have brought MEMS oscillators into that market.

Quartz is still dominant in clock generator applications. These applications require highly specialized output combinations and custom packages. The supply chain for these products is specialized and does not include a MEMS oscillator supplier.

== Typical applications ==
MEMS oscillators are replacing quartz oscillators in a variety of applications such as computing, consumer, networking, communications, automotive and industrial systems.

Programmable MEMS oscillators can be used in most applications where fixed-frequency quartz oscillators are used, such as PCI-Express, SATA, SAS, PCI, USB, Gigabit Ethernet, MPEG video, and cable modems.

MEMS clock generators are useful in complex systems that require multiple frequencies, such as data servers and telecom switches.

MEMS real-time clocks are used in systems that require precise time measurements. Smart meters for gas and electricity are an example that is consuming significant quantities of these devices.

MEMS oscillator types and applications
Device Type	Stability Rating	Applications	Comments
XO – Oscillator	20–100 ppm	Those requiring a general-purpose clock, such as consumer electronics and computing: microprocessors; digital state machines; video and audio clocking; low-bandwidth data communications, e.g., USB and Ethernet	This was the first product category to be supplied by MEMS oscillators
VCXO – Voltage Controlled Oscillator	< 50 ppm	Clock synchronization in: telecom; broadband; video; instrumentation	Clock outputs are "pullable," i.e., their frequency can be "pulled" or fine-tuned. VCXO outputs can be pulled using an analog voltage input.
TCXO – Temperature Compensated Oscillator and VC-TCXO – Voltage Controlled TCXO	0.5–5 ppm	High-performance equipment that requires very stable frequencies: networking; base stations; femtocells; smart meters; GPS systems; mobile systems	VC-TCXO outputs are pullable
SSXO – Spread Spectrum Oscillator	20–100 ppm	Microprocessor-based clocking: desktop PCs; laptops; storage systems; USB	spread-spectrum clocking reduces EMI in systems that are clocked from the oscillators
FSXO – Frequency Select Oscillator	20–100 ppm	Those requiring frequency agility and multi-protocol serial interfaces.	Clock output frequencies are changeable with hardware or serial-select inputs, reducing BOM and simplifying the supply chain
DCXO – Digitally Controlled Oscillator	0.5–100 ppm	Clock synchronization in: telecom; broadband; video; instrumentation	Clock output frequencies are pulled by digital inputs.

The "X" in the names of oscillator types originally denoted "crystal". Some manufacturers have adopted this convention to include MEMS oscillators. Others are substituting "M" for "X" (as in "VCMO" versus "VCXO") to differentiate MEMS-based oscillators from quartz-based oscillators.

== Limitations ==
MEMS oscillators may be detrimentally affected by helium. In 2018, a helium leak from a hospital MRI machine caused widespread failure of nearby iPhones due to their MEMS oscillators. A helium concentration of as little as 2% has been shown to cause complete failure of a MEMS oscillator.

== See also ==
- Electronic component
