= Wafer bonding =

Packaging technology

Wafer bonding is a packaging technology on wafer-level for the fabrication of microelectromechanical systems (MEMS), nanoelectromechanical systems (NEMS), microelectronics and optoelectronics, ensuring a mechanically stable and hermetically sealed encapsulation. The wafers' diameter ranges from 100 mm to 200 mm (4 inch to 8 inch) for MEMS/NEMS and up to 300 mm (12 inch) for the production of microelectronic devices. Smaller wafers were used in the early days of the microelectronics industry, with wafers being just 1 inch in diameter in the 1950s.

== Overview ==
In microelectromechanical systems (MEMS) and nanoelectromechanical systems (NEMS), the package protects the sensitive internal structures from environmental influences such as temperature, moisture, high pressure and oxidizing species. The long-term stability and reliability of the functional elements depend on the encapsulation process, as does the overall device cost. The package has to fulfill the following requirements:

- protection against environmental influences
- heat dissipation
- integration of elements with different technologies
- compatibility with the surrounding periphery
- maintenance of energy and information flow

== Techniques ==
The commonly used and developed bonding methods are as follows:

- Direct bonding
- Surface activated bonding
- Plasma activated bonding
- Anodic bonding
- Eutectic bonding
- Glass frit bonding
- Adhesive bonding
- Thermocompression bonding
- Reactive bonding
- Transient liquid phase diffusion bonding
- Atomic diffusion bonding

== Requirements ==
The bonding of wafers requires specific environmental conditions which can generally be defined as follows:

1. substrate surface
  - flatness
  - smoothness
  - cleanliness
2. bonding environment
  - bond temperature
  - ambient pressure
  - applied force
3. materials
  - substrate materials
  - intermediate layer materials

The actual bond is an interaction of all those conditions and requirements. Hence, the applied technology needs to be chosen in respect to the present substrate and defined specification like max. bearable temperature, mechanical pressure or desired gaseous atmosphere.

== Evaluation ==
The bonded wafers are characterized in order to evaluate a technology's yield, bonding strength and level of hermeticity either for fabricated devices or for the purpose of process development. Therefore, several different approaches for the bond characterization have emerged. On the one hand non-destructive optical methods to find cracks or interfacial voids are used beside destructive techniques for the bond strength evaluation, like tensile or shear testing. On the other hand, the unique properties of carefully chosen gases or the pressure depending vibration behavior of micro resonators are exploited for hermeticity testing.
