= Robert R. Squires =

American chemist (1953–1998)

Robert Reed Squires
- Born: January 11, 1953; Oakland, California
- Died: September 30, 1998 (aged 45); Lafayette, Indiana
- Education: California State University, Chico (B.A.)Yale University (M.Phil., Ph.D.)
- Known for: Gas-phase ion chemistry
- Awards: Sloan Foundation Fellowship; Nobel Laureate Signature Award; Biemann Medal
- Scientific career
- Fields: Physical chemistry
- Workplaces: Purdue University
- Thesis: Application of an Automated Calorimetry System in the Study of Steric Effects (1980)
- Doctoral advisor: Kenneth B. Wiberg

Robert Reed Squires (January 11, 1953 – September 30, 1998) was an American chemist known for his work in gas phase ion chemistry and flowing afterglow mass spectrometry.

== Early life and education ==
Squires was born in Northern California and grew up in Los Angeles. He received an A.A. degree at El Camino College in 1973 and then returned to Northern California where he received a B.A. at California State University, Chico. He then went on to Yale University where he worked in the laboratory of Kenneth B. Wiberg on the thermochemistry of organic compounds. He received his M.Phil. degree in 1977 and a Ph.D. in 1980. He took a postdoctoral position with Charles DePuy and Veronica Bierbaum at the University of Colorado, Boulder where he studied the reactions of gas-phase ions using the flowing afterglow technique.

== Academic career ==
Squires took a position as an assistant professor at Purdue University in 1981 where he constructed two unique mass spectrometers: a flowing afterglow triple quadrupole mass spectrometer and a flowing afterglow selected ion flow tube triple quadrupole mass spectrometer. In 1986, he was promoted to Associate Professor and in 1990 to Professor.

== Awards ==
Among his awards were an Alfred P. Sloan Foundation Fellowship in 1987, the American Chemical Society Nobel Laureate Signature Award for Graduate Education in Chemistry (with Susan Graul) in 1991, and the American Society for Mass Spectrometry Biemann Medal in 1998. The Purdue University Department of Chemistry Robert R. Squires Scholarship was established in his honor.
