= Eutectic bonding =

Wafer bonding technique

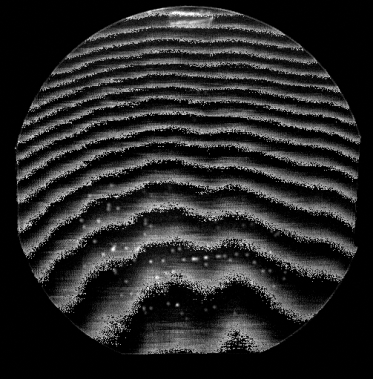
Ultrasonic image of a blank Au-Si eutectic bonded wafer

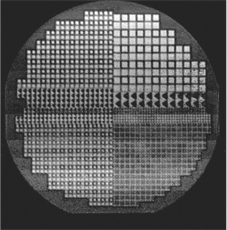
Ultrasonic image of a patterned Au-Si eutectic bonded wafer

Eutectic bonding, also referred to as eutectic soldering, describes a wafer bonding technique with an intermediate metal layer that can produce a eutectic system. Those eutectic metals are alloys that transform directly from solid to liquid state, or vice versa from liquid to solid state, at a specific composition and temperature without passing a two-phase equilibrium, i.e. liquid and solid state. The fact that the eutectic temperature can be much lower than the melting temperature of the two or more pure elements can be important in eutectic bonding.

Eutectic alloys are deposited by sputtering, dual source evaporation or electroplating. They can also be formed by diffusion reactions of pure materials and subsequently melting of the eutectic composition.

Eutectic bonding to transfer epitaxial materials such as GaAs-AlGaAs onto silicon (Si) substrates with high yields for the general purpose of optoelectronics integration with Si electronics as well as to overcome fundamental issues such as lattice mismatch in hetero-epitaxy, was developed and reported by Venkatasubramanian et al. in 1992, and the performance of eutectic-bonded GaAs-AlGaAs materials for solar cells was further validated and reported by the same group in 1994.

Eutectic bonding is able to produce hermetically sealed packages and electrical interconnection within a single process (compare ultrasonic images). This procedure is conducted at low temperatures, which results in low resultant stress induced in final assembly, high bonding strength, large fabrication yield and a good reliability. These attributes are dependent on the coefficient of thermal expansion between the substrates.

The most important parameters for eutectic bonding are bonding temperature, bonding duration, and tool pressure.

== Overview ==
Eutectic bonding is based on the ability of silicon (Si) to alloy with numerous metals and form a eutectic system. The most established eutectic formations are Si with gold (Au) or with aluminium (Al). This bonding procedure is most commonly used for Si or glass wafers that are coated with an Au/Al film and partly with adhesive layer (compare with following image).

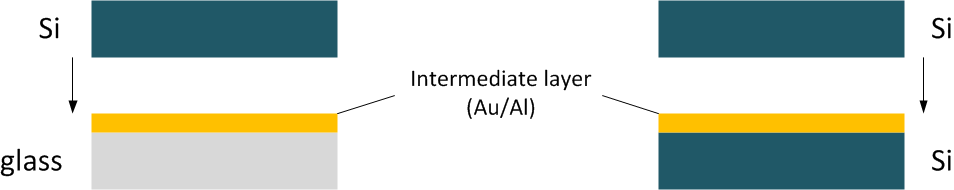
Bonding of Si wafer to (l) glass or (r) silicon wafer coated with Au or Al layer.

The Si-Au couple has the advantages of an exceptionally low eutectic temperature, an already widespread use in die bonding and the compatibility with Al interconnects. Additionally, often used eutectic alloys for wafer bonding in semiconductor fabrication are shown in the table. Choosing the correct alloy is determined by the processing temperature and compatibility of the materials used.

Commonly used eutectic alloys
Eutectic alloy	Eutectic composition	Eutectic temperature
Au-In	0.6 / 99.4 wt-%	156 °C
Cu-Sn	5 / 95 wt-%	231 °C
Au-Sn	80 / 20 wt-%	280 °C
Au-Ge	72 / 28 wt-%	361 °C
Au-Si	97.15 / 2.85 wt-%	370 °C
Al-Ge	49 / 51 wt-%	419 °C
Al-Si	87.5 / 12.5 wt-%	580 °C

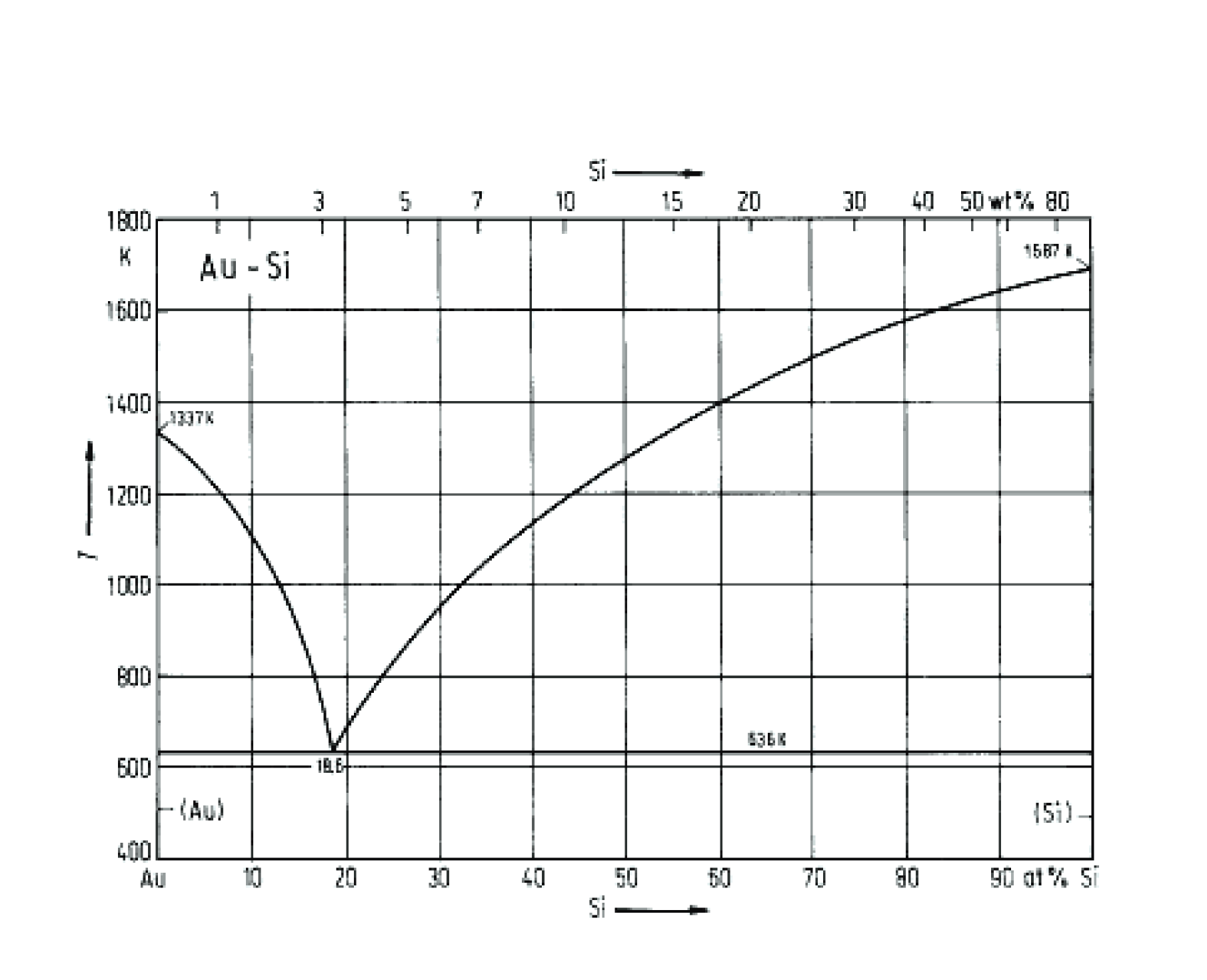
Si-Au phase diagram.

Further, the bonding has less restrictions, concerning substrate roughness and planarity than direct bonding. Compared to anodic bonding, no high voltages are required that can be detrimental to electrostatic MEMS. Additionally, the eutectic bonding procedure promotes a better out-gassing and hermeticity than bonding with organic intermediate layers. Compared to glass frit bonding, the advantage sticks out that the reduction of seal ring geometries, an increase of the hermeticity levels and a shrinking of device size is possible. The geometry of eutectic seals is characterized by a thickness of 1 - 5 μm and a wideness of > 50 μm. The use of eutectic alloy brings the advantage of providing electrical conduction and interfacing with redistribution layers.

The temperature of the eutectic bonding procedure is dependent on the used material. The bonding happens at a specific weight-% and temperature, e.g. 370 °C at 2.85 wt-% Si for Au intermediate layer (compare to phase diagram).

The procedure of eutectic bonding is divided into following steps:

1. Substrate processing
2. Conditioning prior to bonding (e.g. oxide removal)
3. Bonding process (Temperature, Mechanical Pressure for a few minutes)
4. Cooling process

== Procedural steps ==
=== Pre-treatment ===
The surface preparation is the most important step to accomplish a successful eutectic bonding. Prior to preparation the oxide on the silicon surface acts as a diffusion barrier; the eutectic metal bond must be formed against clean silicon.

To remove existing native oxide layers wet chemical etching (HF clean), dry chemical etching or chemical vapor deposition (CVD) with different types of crystals can be used. Also some applications require a surface pre-treatment using dry oxide removal processes, e.g. H_{2} plasma and CF_{4} plasma.

An additional method for the removal of unwanted surface films, i.e. oxide, is applying ultrasound during the attachment process. As soon the tool is lowered a relative vibration between the wafer and the substrate is applied. Commonly, industrial bonders use ultrasonic with 60KHz vibration frequencies and 100 μm vibration amplitude. A successful oxide removal results in a solid, hermetically tight connection.

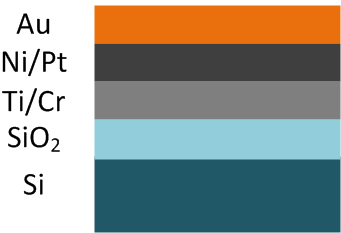
Schematic of typical wafer composition including an optional layer of Ni/Pt.

A second method to ensure the eutectic metal adheres on the Si wafer is by using an adhesion layer. This thin intermediate metal layer adheres well to the oxide and the eutectic metal. Well suitable metals for an Au-Si compound are titanium (Ti) and chromium (Cr) resulting in, e.g. Si-SiO_{2}-Ti-Au or Si-SiO_{2}-Cr-Au. The adhesion layer is used to break up the oxide by diffusion of silicon into the used material. A typical wafer is composed of a silicon wafer with oxide, 30 - 200 nm Ti or Cr layer and Au layer of > 500 nm thickness.

In the wafer fabrication a nickel (Ni) or a platinum (Pt) layer is added between the gold and the substrate wafer as diffusion barrier. The diffusion barrier avoids interaction between Au and Ti/Cr and requires higher temperatures to form a reliable and uniform bond. Further, the very limited solubility of silicon in titanium and chromium can prevent the developing of Au-Si eutectic composition based on the diffusion of silicon through titanium into gold.

The eutectic materials and optional adhesion layers are usually bonded by deposition as an alloy in one layer by dual component electroplating, dual-source evaporation (physical vapor deposition), or composite alloy sputtering.

The removal of contamination, on the for silicon most established Au layer, can be done using water flushing and wafer heating.

=== Bonding process ===
The contacting of the substrates is applied directly after the pre-treatment of the surfaces to avoid oxide regeneration. The bonding procedure for oxidizing metals (not Au) generally takes place in a reduced atmosphere of 4% hydrogen and an inert carrier gas flow, e.g. nitrogen. The requirements for the bonding equipment lies in the thermal and pressure uniformity across the wafer. This enables uniformly compressed seal lines.

The substrate is aligned and fixed on a heated stage and the silicon wafer in a heated tool. The substrates inserted in the bonding chamber are contacted maintaining the alignment. As soon the layers are in atomic contact the reaction between those starts. To support the reaction mechanical pressure is applied and heating above the eutectic temperature is carried out.

The diffusivity and solubility of gold into silicon substrate increases with rising bonding temperatures. A higher temperature than the eutectic temperature is usually preferred for the bonding procedure. This may result in the formation of a thicker Au-Si alloy layer and further a stronger eutectic bond.

The diffusion starts as soon as the layers are in atomic contact at elevated temperatures. The contacted surface layer containing the eutectic composites melts, forming a liquid phase alloy, accelerating further mixing processes and diffusion until the saturation composition is reached.

Other common eutectic bonding alloys commonly used for wafer bonding include Au-Sn, Al-Ge, Au-Ge, Au-In and Cu-Sn.

The chosen bonding temperature usually is some degrees higher than the eutectic temperature so the melt becomes less viscous and readily flows due to higher roughness to surface areas that are not in atomic contact. To prevent the melt pressed outside the bonding interface the optimization of the bonding parameter control is necessary, e.g. low force on the wafers. Otherwise, it may lead to short circuits or device malfunctions of the used components (electrical and mechanical). The heating of the wafers leads to a change in the surface texture due to formation of fine silicon micro structures on top of the gold surface.

=== Cooling process ===
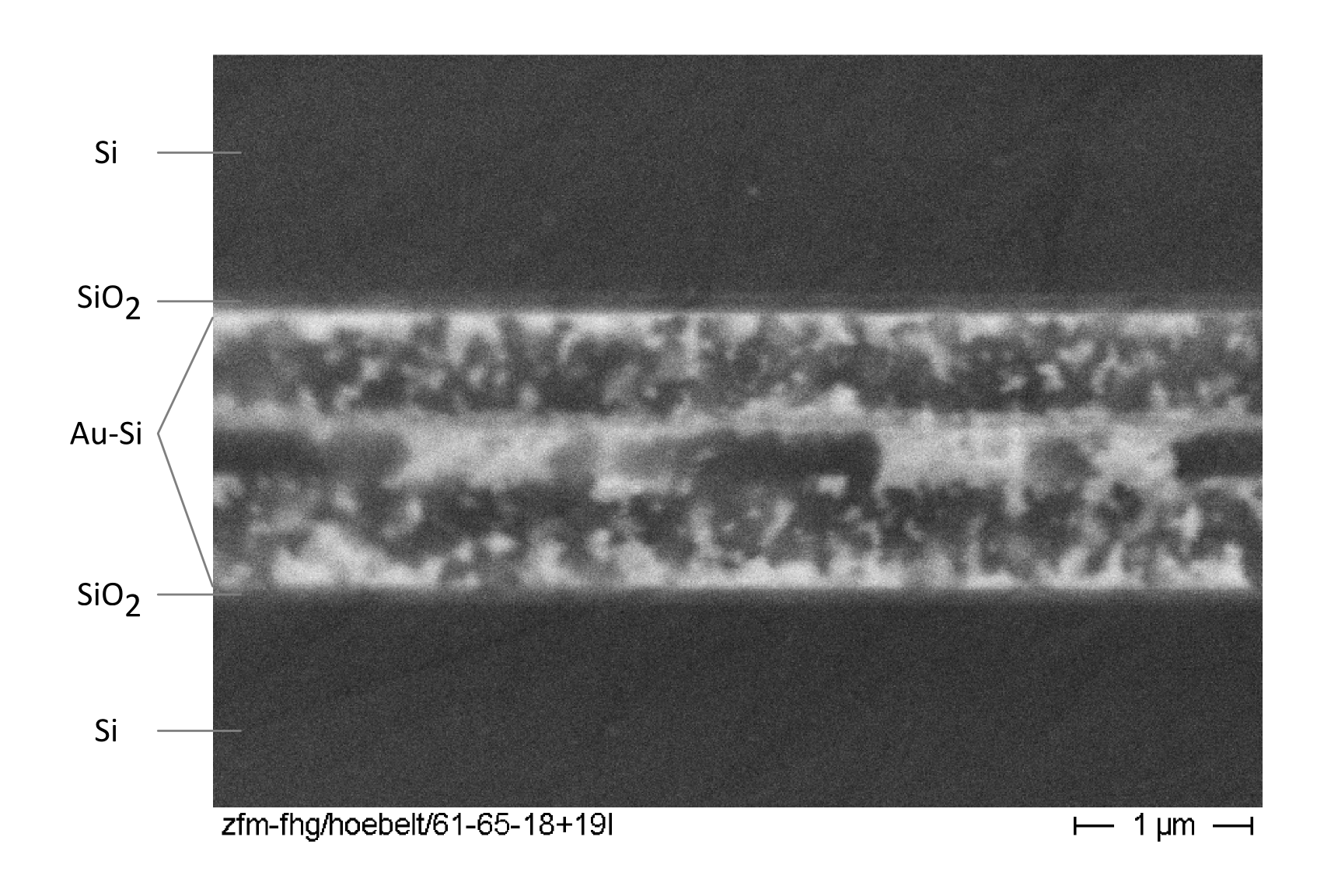
Cross-section SEM image of the bonding interface between Si and Au with 80.3 Si atom percentage.

The material mix is solidified when the temperature decreases below eutectic point or the concentration ratio changes (for Si-Au: T < 370 °C). The solidification leads to epitaxial growth of silicon and gold on top of the silicon substrate resulting in numerous small silicon islands protruding from a polycrystalline gold alloy (compare to cross-section image of the bonding interface). This can result in bonding strengths around 70 MPa.

The importance lies in the appropriate process parameters, i.e. sufficient bonding temperature control. Otherwise the bond cracks due to stress caused by a mismatch of the thermal expansion coefficient. This stress is able to relax over time.

== Potential Uses ==
Because of the high bonding strength this procedure is especially applicable for pressure sensors or fluidics. Micro-mechanical sensors and actuators with electronic or mechanical functions spanning multiple wafers can be fabricated.
