= Raj Mohanty =

- Occupations: Physicist, academic, and entrepreneur

Academic background
- Education: Ph.D. in Quantum Physics
- Alma mater: University of Maryland, College Park; California Institute of Technology

Academic work
- Institutions: Boston University

Pritiraj Mohanty is a physicist and entrepreneur. He is a professor of physics at Boston University. He is most known for his work on quantum coherence, mesoscopic physics, nanomechanical systems, and nanotechnology with a recent focus on biosensing and nanomechanical computing.

Mohanty is the founder of FemtoDx, Sand 9, and Ninth Sense.

== Education ==
Mohanty graduated with a Ph.D. in Quantum Physics from the University of Maryland, College Park. Subsequently, he completed his Postdoc at the California Institute of Technology.

== Career ==
Following his postdoctoral research, Mohanty joined Boston University as a faculty member. He started his career as an astrophysicist on the ROSAT Satellite Team at the Goddard Space Flight Center in NASA.[5] He has been a Physics Professor at Boston University since 2011. He is a professor at Materials Science Division as well.[6] He has served as an Affiliated Faculty at the Boston Medical Center (Cancer Center).

Following his postdoctoral research, Mohanty joined Boston University as a faculty member. He started his career as an Astrophysicist on the ROSAT Satellite Team at the Goddard Space Flight Center in NASA. He has been a Physics Professor at Boston University since 2011. He is a professor at Materials Science Division as well. He has served as an Affiliated Faculty at the Boston Medical Center (Cancer Center).

Mohanty was the CEO of Sand 9, a semiconductor microelectromechanical systems (MEMS) company, from June 2007 to January 2010. He currently serves as the CEO of FemtoDx, a medical device company he founded.

== Research ==
Mohanty’s research spans quantum physics, nanomechanics, biosensing, and nanomechanical computing. His recent research interest is primarily focused on analog machine learning, wireless power transfer, and functional nanomaterials.

== Nanomechanical systems and MEMS ==
Mohanty’s research on nanomechanical systems and Micro-Electro-Mechanical Systems (MEMS) focuses on the use of nanoscale mechanical resonators to study fundamental physics problems. These problems include macroscopic quantum systems, electron spin torque, stochastic resonance, synchronization, mechanical analog of nonlinear optics of effect and nonlinear dissipation.

A complementary aspect of Mohanty’s research involves the use of some of these concepts to build devices for real-world applications. These include nonlinear nanomechanical resonators as mechanical bits or memory, high-frequency nanomechanical oscillators for silicon-based timing oscillators for cellular and GPS timing devices, nanomechanical torque oscillators for detecting electron spin flip, second and third harmonic generation using piezoelectric nonlinearity, wireless actuation of mechanical resonators for potential use in implantable devices in the human brain or the body, wireless transfer of information using radiation force on mechanical resonators.

=== Nanomechanical computing ===
In 2004, Mohanty’s team proposed and demonstrated that the nonlinear bistability of a nanomechanical beam can be used as a nanomechanical bit for computation. They showed that the nanomechanical beam can be controlled to remain in one of the two states ("1" or "0") with 100% fidelity. Using this bistable system, Mohanty’s team demonstrated that the signal can be enhanced by adding white noise to the nanomechanical system, following the concept of stochastic resonance. They demonstrated a noise-assisted reprogrammable nanomechanical logic gate. In an attempt to create an energy-efficient computing architecture, Mohanty and his team developed a reversible computation building block and implemented a Fredkin gate, a universal logic gate from which any other reversible gate can be built. These universal logic gates were shown to be capable of processing information with an energy cost approaching the fundamental von-Neumann Landauer limit.

=== Silicon Brain: Neurocomputing ===
Mohanty’s team has also worked on creating a fundamental building block for neurocomputing using nano- and micro-mechanical resonators. They argued that a network of mechanical oscillators can be used to store, retrieve and recognize complex visual patterns through the corresponding synchronized state. They demonstrated that the smallest unit of the network, a coupled two-oscillator system displays all the aspects of synchronization. Separately, the team put forward an architecture consisting of a network of mechanical oscillators that can be used for visual pattern recognition.

=== Wireless power and information transfer ===
Mohanty’s team has demonstrated the use of micromechanical resonators for wireless power transfer, specifically to be used as implantable biomedical devices in the body or the brain where the size of the device is even more important than the power efficiency. Such devices can be placed inside the brain with precise spatial positioning and externally charged with high efficiency. In a separate effort, Mohanty and his team have demonstrated actuation of micromechanical resonators using radiation pressure generated by a laser. The team has been able to transfer information, including images, encoded in the laser light beam, into the micromechanical resonator placed at a distance with 100% fidelity.

== Biosensing ==
Mohanty has worked in developing silicon-based biosensing platform for quantitative detection of protein and enzyme markers in blood and other physiological fluids. Using an approach of top-down lithography, Mohanty and his team demonstrated that their silicon nanowire field effect transistor sensor can detect a number of analytes, relevant in cancer and cardiovascular diseases, with clinical-level sensitivity and specificity.

== Quantum computing, decoherence, and mesoscopic physics ==
In the early part of his career, Mohanty’s research focused on quantum decoherence and mesoscopic physics. He focused his study on quantum computing and quantum coherence in mesoscopic systems. In a study, Mohanty and Webb showed that there is intrinsic decoherence of electrons that persists even at zero temperature. He explored quantum fluctuations at zero-point fluctuations. The conducted study indicated that at low temperatures, it is the intrinsic environment that affects the phase-coherence time in the mesoscopic system. The study aimed to integrate the limited dephasing time with temperature dependency in the thermal regime. His work in mesoscopic physics continued to the ultrasensitive measurement of persistent current in mesoscopic gold rings, where he and his team were able to measure persistent current generated by as few as one electron. Mohanty also proposed a novel mechanism of persistent current. Using his measurement of conductance fluctuations, Mohanty and Webb demonstrated violation of one-parameter scaling hypothesis.

== Awards and honors ==
- 2005 – National Science Foundation CAREER Awards, CAS
- 2005 – Sloan Fellow

== Bibliography ==
- Mohanty, P., Jariwala, E. M. Q., & Webb, R. A. (1997). Intrinsic decoherence in mesoscopic systems. Physical Review Letters, 78(17), 3366.
- Badzey, R. L., & Mohanty, P. (2005). Coherent signal amplification in bistable nanomechanical oscillators by stochastic resonance. Nature, 437(7061), 995-998.
- Shim, S. B., Imboden, M., & Mohanty, P. (2007). Synchronized oscillation in coupled nanomechanical oscillators. science, 316(5821), 95-99.
