= Remote plasma =

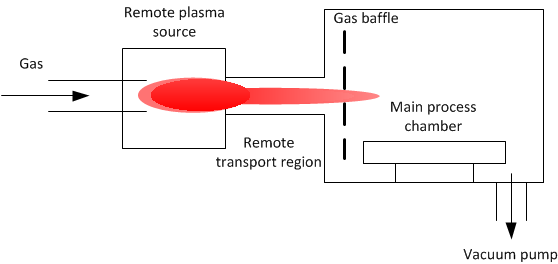
Remote plasma system.

A remote plasma (also downstream plasma or afterglow plasma) is a plasma processing method in which the plasma and material interaction occurs at a location remote from the plasma in the plasma afterglow.

== See also ==
- Chemical vapor deposition
- Corona treatment
- Physical vapor deposition
- Plasma activation
- Plasma chemistry
- Plasma cleaning
- Plasma-activated bonding
- Reactive ion etching
