= Rovibronic coupling =

Rovibronic coupling, also known as rotation/vibration-electron coupling, denotes the simultaneous interactions between rotational, vibrational, and electronic degrees of freedom in a molecule. When a rovibronic transition occurs, the rotational, vibrational, and electronic states change simultaneously, unlike in rovibrational coupling. The coupling can be observed using spectroscopy, and is most easily seen in the Renner–Teller effect in which a linear polyatomic molecule is in a degenerate electronic state and bending vibrations will cause a large rovibronic coupling.

== See also ==
- Afterglow plasma
- Vibronic coupling
