= Surface activated bonding =

Surface activated bonding (SAB) is a non-high-temperature wafer bonding technology with atomically clean and activated surfaces. Surface activation prior to bonding by using fast atom bombardment is typically employed to clean the surfaces. High-strength bonding of semiconductors, metals, and dielectrics can be obtained even at room temperature.

== Overview ==
In the standard SAB method, wafer surfaces are activated by argon fast atom bombardment in ultra-high vacuum (UHV) of 10^{−4}–10^{−7} Pa. The bombardment removes adsorbed contaminants and native oxides on the surfaces. The activated surfaces are atomically clean and reactive for formation of direct bonds between wafers when they are brought into contact even at room temperature.

== Researches on SAB ==
The SAB method has been studied for bonding of various materials, as shown in Table I.

Table I. Studies of standard SAB for various materials
	Si	Ge	GaAs	SiC	Cu	Al_{2}O_{3}	SiO_{2}
Si							
Ge							
GaAs							
SiC							
Cu							
Al_{2}O_{3}							
SiO_{2}							Failure

The standard SAB, however, failed to bond some materials such as SiO_{2} and polymer films. The modified SAB was developed to solve this problem, by using a sputtering deposited Si intermediate layer to improve the bond strength.

Table II. Modified SAB with Si intermediate layer
	Bonding intermediate layer	References
SiO_{2}-SiO_{2}	Sputtered Fe-Si on SiO_{2}	
Polymer films	Sputtered Fe-Si on both sides	
Si-SiC	Sputtered Si on SiC	
Si-SiO_{2}	Sputtered Si on SiO_{2}	

The combined SAB has been developed for SiO_{2}-SiO_{2} and Cu/SiO_{2} hybrid bonding, without use of any intermediate layer.

Table III. Combined SAB using Si-containing Ar beam
	Bond interface	References
SiO_{2}-SiO_{2}	Direct bond interface	
Cu-Cu, SiO_{2}-SiO_{2}, SiO_{2}-SiN_{x}	direct bond interface	

== Technical specifications ==
Materials	Semiconductor: Si-Si, Ge-Ge, GaAs-SiC, SiC-SiC, Si-SiC, etc.; Metal: Al-Al, Cu-Cu, etc.; Dielectric: Polymer films, SiO_{2}, etc.; Cu/Dielectric Hybrid: Cu/SiO_{2} and Cu/SiO_{2}/SiN_{x}
Advantages	Low process temperature: room temperature–200 °C; No concerns of thermal stress and damages; High bonding quality; Semiconductor and metal bonding interfaces without oxides; Completely dry process without wet chemical cleaning; Process compatibility to semiconductor technology
Drawbacks	High vacuum level (10^{−4}–10^{−7} Pa)
