= Sand 9 =

- Type: Private
- Founded: Cambridge, Massachusetts (2007)
- Founder: Pritiraj Mohanty, Matt Crowley
- Headquarters: Cambridge, Massachusetts
- Key people: Pritiraj Mohanty (co-founder); Matt Crowley (co-founder); Vincent Graziani (CEO, president)
- Website: www.sand9.com

Sand 9 is a fabless Micro-electromechanical system (MEMS) company based in Cambridge, Massachusetts. Sand 9 developed a piezoelectric MEMS resonator to serve as an alternative for quartz timing devices in applications such as smart phones, low-power wireless devices, and communications infrastructure equipment.

Sand 9 was co-founded by Pritiraj Mohanty and Matt Crowley in 2007. Vincent Graziani is the CEO.

== History ==
Pritiraj Mohanty, a Boston University physicist, and Matt Crowley, former director of Boston University's technology development fund, co-founded Sand 9 in 2007. The company aimed to produce timing products with a better price-to-performance ratio than quartz in core markets.

Sand 9 introduced their first two products, TM061 and TM361, on September 3, 2013. TM061 and TM361 are precision MEMS timing products for the Internet of Things and mobile devices. On November 18, 2013, the TM651 was introduced for communications infrastructure, industrial and military applications. According to EE Times, a trade publication, the TM651 is the first high-precision temperature compensated MEMS oscillator (TCMO) to meet the noise and stability demands of communication, industrial and military applications. TM061 started sampling to lead customers in November and the TM361 in December 2013.

GLOBALFOUNDRIES, a semiconductor foundry, is Sand 9's foundry partner. GLOBALFOUNDRIES produces approximately one thousand 200 mm wafers per month.

=== Funding ===
Flybridge Capital led Sand 9's series A funding round in 2008. Their Series B funding raised $12 million and was reported in May 2010. In June 2012, Sand 9 raised $23 million in its series C funding round, led by Intel with participation from Vulcan capital and Analog Devices. Ericsson contributed $3 million in September 2012.

== Piezoelectric Micro-electromechanical systems (MEMS) ==
Sand 9 developed its piezoelectric MEMS resonator technology as an alternative to quartz timing devices. Sand 9 uses aluminum nitride, a thin film that is deposited using standard semiconductor/MEMS fabrication technology, for the piezoelectric layer. The silicon MEMS products are smaller than comparable quartz devices and currently operate at fundamental frequencies up to 125 MHz. Silicon-based MEMS products can simplify system design, reduce part counts, simplify the supply chain, and improve manufacturing yields when compared to quartz. Sand 9 MEMS products can be co-packaged and overmolded with standard semiconductor ICs to eliminate the need for external timing.
