= Plasma afterglow =

A plasma afterglow (also afterglow) is the radiation emitted from a plasma after the source of ionization is removed. The external electromagnetic fields that sustained the plasma glow are absent or insufficient to maintain the discharge in the afterglow. A plasma afterglow can either be a temporal, due to an interrupted (pulsed) plasma source, or spatial, due to a distant plasma source. In the afterglow, plasma-generated species de-excite and participate in secondary chemical reactions that tend to form stable species. Depending on the gas composition, super-elastic collisions may continue to sustain the plasma in the afterglow for a while by releasing the energy stored in rovibronic degrees of freedom of the atoms and molecules of the plasma. Especially in molecular gases, the plasma chemistry in the afterglow is significantly different from the plasma glow. The afterglow of a plasma is still a plasma and as thus retains most of the properties of a plasma.

== History ==
The first published pictures of plasma afterglow were taken in 1953.

Helium afterglow, one of the most commonly used forms of afterglow, was first described in 1963 by Arthur L. Schmeltekopf Jr. and H. P. Broida.

The first flowing afterglow ionization studies began in the early 1960s in an effort to understand atmospheric ion chemistry. At the time stationary afterglow studies had already been done however this approach was limited by lack of versatility and lacked consistency as studies done prior to 1964 showed common atmospheric reactions to have drastically differing reaction rates between studies. Flowing-afterglow was then used to more precisely describe the rate constants of common atmospheric reactions

== Remote plasma ==
Basic remote plasma diagram

A remote plasma refers to a plasma that is spatially separated from the external electromagnetic fields that initiate the discharge. An afterglow is a remote plasma if the plasma is channeled away from the original plasma source.

An advantage that remote plasma has over temporal plasma is that remote plasma can be used as a continuous plasma source and thus has more applications in supplying reagent ions for most systems.

Remote plasmas are often used in the field of analytical chemistry when a constant stream of ions is required. They are also very commonly used a method of cleaning complex vacuum systems without having to take them apart.

== Temporal plasma ==
A temporal plasma refers to an afterglow from a plasma source that is time delineated. Removing the source of excitation allows for an afterglow to be present in the same space that the initial plasma was excited for a short time.

An advantage that temporal plasma has over remote plasma is that it can be contained in a closed system and thus makes controlling the temperature and pressure is easier.

Temporal plasma is often used to replicate ionic reactions in atmospheric conditions in a controlled environment.

== Applications ==
=== Flowing afterglow ===
A flowing afterglow is an ion source that is used to create ions in a flow of inert gas, typically helium or argon. Flowing afterglow ion sources usually consist of a dielectric discharge that gases are channeled through to be excited and thus made into plasma. Flowing afterglow ion sources can be coupled with a selected-ion flow-tube for selection of reactant ions. When this ion source is coupled with mass spectrometry it is referred to as flowing afterglow mass spectrometry.

Flowing-afterglow mass spectrometry uses a flowing afterglow to create protonated water cluster ions in a helium or argon carrier gas in a flow tube that react with sample molecules that are measured by a mass spectrometer downstream. These systems can be used for trace gas analysis. This works by keeping the initial ionization source spatially separated from the target analyte and channeling the afterglow of the initial ionization towards the analyte. Analytes are added downstream to create ion products. Ions Detection of ions is usually accomplished using a mass spectrometer or by optical spectroscopy.

=== Stationary afterglow ===
Stationary afterglow (SA) is a technique for studying remote plasma that consist of a gaseous mixture inside a bulb that is subjected to an ionizing pulse. After said ionizing pulse the ion composition of the mixture is measured as a function of time at the wall of the containing bulb. Stationary afterglow methods are often used to study atmospheric reactions as they mimic atmospheric conditions in a controlled environment.

=== Cleaning and sterilization ===
Plasma afterglow has shown to be an effective means of cleaning and sterilizing difficult to take apart machinery and glassware. Plasma cleaning uses remote plasma sources to generate an afterglow that is ventilated into the system to be cleaned and then the afterglow ions react with the contaminants. When oxygen is used as the carrier gas, ionized oxygen species react with heavier organic compounds to form H_{2}O, CO_{2}, and CO. These products are then easily vented from the system effectively removing organic contaminants from the system. This provides the advantage of not having to take systems apart and thus saves time on disassembly and on vacuum systems it saves time changing the pressure of the system.

This plasma cleaning method is especially effective for chemical vapor deposition methods where cleanliness is a key part of productivity.

== See also ==
- Charles H. DePuy (chemist)
