= Borate glass =

Type of glass

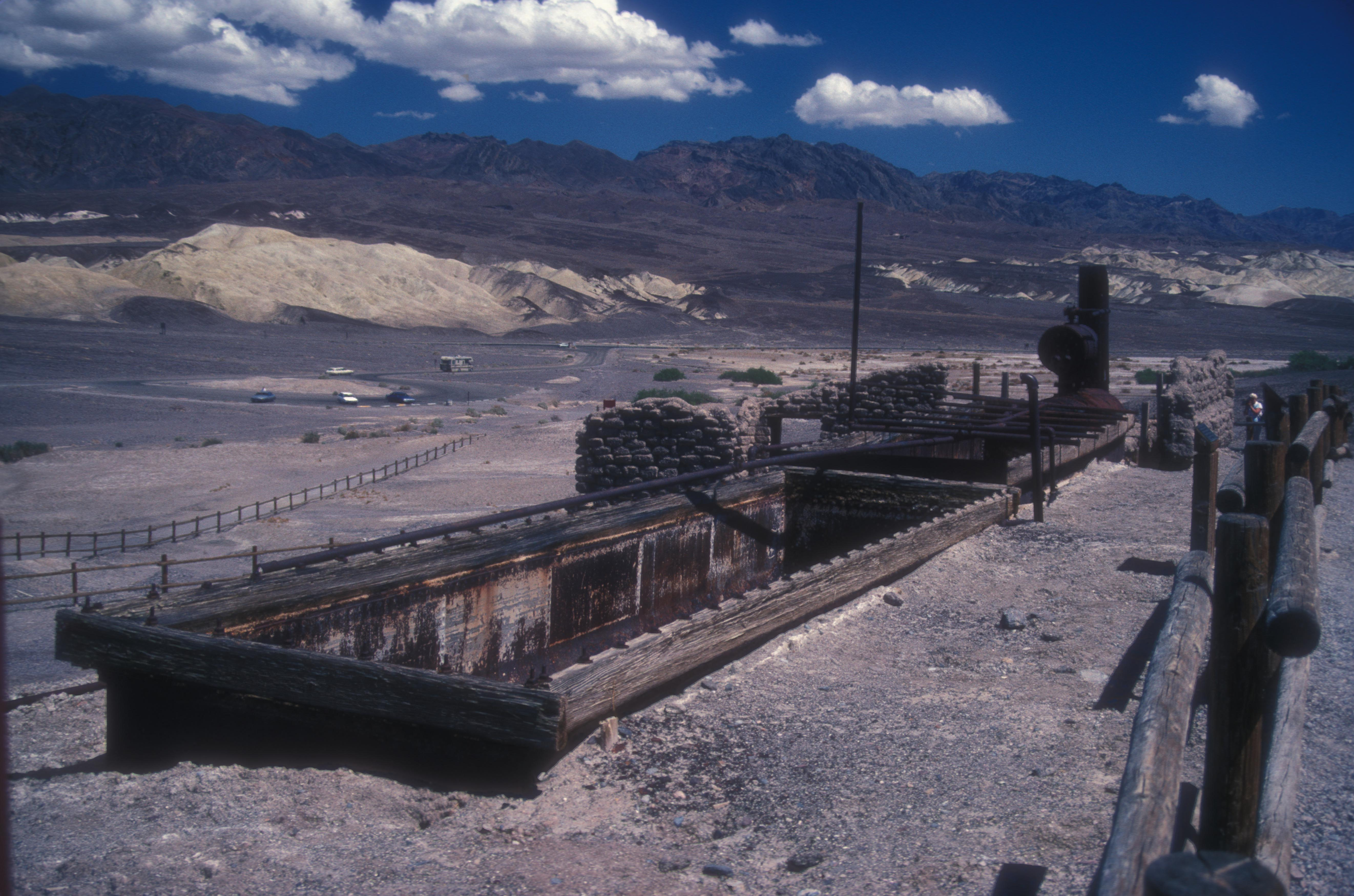
An old borax plant in Death Valley, California.

Borate glasses have a more complex action of alkali (or other modifier) ions than silicate glasses. In silicates, depolymerisation occurs due to the oxygen added alongside the alkali or modifier ions introducing non-bridging oxygen, whereas in borate glasses it can also lead to the conversion of trigonal planar BO3 units into singly charged BO4 tetrahedra, thereby increasing, rather than decreasing the network connectivity and polymerisation. Borate glasses also have major differences in their optical and other properties.

The single largest use of boron compounds in the world (accounting for half of total global use) is the production of certain types of boron-treated glass fiber for insulating and structural fiberglass. In these uses the boron may be present as borax or boron oxide, and adds to the structural strength of the glass as borosilicate, or is added as a fluxing agent to decrease the melting temperature of pure silica, which is difficult to extrude as fibers and work with in pure form, due to the high temperatures involved.
