= Transient liquid phase diffusion bonding =

Welding process

Transient liquid phase diffusion bonding (TLPDB) is a joining process that has been applied for bonding many metallic and ceramic systems which cannot be bonded by conventional fusion welding techniques. The bonding process produces joints with a uniform composition profile, tolerant of surface oxides and geometrical defects. The bonding technique has been exploited in a wide range of applications, from the production and repair of turbine engines in the aerospace industry, to nuclear power plants, and in making connections to integrated circuit dies as a part of the microelectronics industry.

== Process ==
Transient liquid phase diffusion bonding is a process that differs from diffusion bonding. In transient liquid phase diffusion bonding, an element or alloy with a lower melting point in an interlayer diffuses into the lattice and grain boundaries of the substrates at the bonding temperature. Solid state diffusional processes lead to a change of composition at the bond interface and the dissimilar interlayer melts at a lower temperature than the parent materials. Thus, a thin layer of liquid spreads along the interface to form a joint at a lower temperature than the melting point of either of the parent materials. This method differs from brazing in that it is "isothermally solidifying". While holding the temperature above the filler metal melting point, interdiffusion shifts the composition away from eutectic, so solidification occurs at the process temperature. If sufficient interdiffusion occurs, the joint will remain solid and strong well above the original melt process temperature. This is why it is termed "transient liquid phase." The liquid solidifies before cooling.

== Interlayer ==
In this technique it is necessary to select a suitable interlayer by considering its wettability, flow characteristics, high stability to prevent reactions with the base materials, and the ability to form a composition having a remelt temperature higher than the bonding temperature. The joining technique dates back to ancient times. For example, copper oxide painted as an interlayer and covered with tallow or glue to hold gold balls on to a gold article were heated in a reducing flame to form a eutectic alloy at the bond area.

== Kinetics ==
There are many theories on the kinetics of the bonding process but the most common theory divides the process into four main stages. The stages are:

1. dissolution of the interlayer
2. homogenization of the liquid
3. isothermal solidification
4. homogenization of the bond region
