= Plasma activation =

Plasma activation (or plasma functionalization) is a method of surface modification employing plasma processing, which improves surface adhesion properties of many materials including metals, glass, ceramics, a broad range of polymers and textiles and even natural materials such as wood and seeds. Plasma functionalization also refers to the introduction of functional groups on the surface of exposed materials. It is widely used in industrial processes to prepare surfaces for bonding, gluing, coating and painting. Plasma processing achieves this effect through a combination of reduction of metal oxides, ultra-fine surface cleaning from organic contaminants, modification of the surface topography and deposition of functional chemical groups. Importantly, the plasma activation can be performed at atmospheric pressure using air or typical industrial gases including hydrogen, nitrogen and oxygen. Thus, the surface functionalization is achieved without expensive vacuum equipment or wet chemistry, which positively affects its costs, safety and environmental impact. Fast processing speeds further facilitate numerous industrial applications.

== Introduction ==
Quality of adhesive bonding such as gluing, painting, varnishing and coating depends strongly on the ability of the adhesive to efficiently cover (wet) the substrate area. This happens when the surface energy of the substrate is greater than the surface energy of the adhesive. However, high strength adhesives have high surface energy. Thus, their application is problematic for low surface energy materials such as polymers. To solve this problem, surface treatment is used as a preparation step before adhesive bonding. It cleans the surface from the organic contaminants, removes a weak boundary layer, chemically bonds to the substrate a strong layer with high surface energy and chemical affinity to the adhesive, and modifies the surface topography enabling capillary action by the adhesive. Importantly, surface preparation provides a reproducible surface allowing consistent bonding results.

Many industries employ surface preparation methods including wet chemistry, exposure to UV light, flame treatment and various types of plasma activation. Advantage of the plasma activation lies in its ability to achieve all necessary activation objectives in one-step without the use of chemicals. Thus, plasma activation is simple, versatile and environmentally friendly.

== Types of plasmas used for surface activation ==
Many types of plasmas can be used for surface activation. However, due to economic reasons, atmospheric pressure plasmas found most applications. They include arc discharge, corona discharge, dielectric barrier discharge and its variation piezoelectric direct discharge.

=== Arc discharge ===
Arc discharges at atmospheric pressure are self-sustained DC electric discharges with large electric currents, typically higher than 1 A, in some cases reaching up to 100.000 A, and relatively low voltages, typically of the order of 10 – 100 V. Due to high collision frequencies of plasma species, atmospheric pressure arcs are in thermal equilibrium having temperatures of the order of 6.000 – 12.000 °C. Most of the arc volume is electrically neutral except for thin anode and cathode layers where strong electric fields are present. These typically collision-less layers have voltage drops of about 10 – 20 V. Ions, which are produced within the cathode layer, accelerate in this voltage and impact the cathode surface with high energies. This process heats the cathode stimulating thermal electron emission, which sustains the high discharge currents. On the cathode surface the electric currents concentrate at fast moving spots with sizes of 1 – 100 μm. Within these spots, the cathode material reaches local temperatures of 3000 °C, leading to its evaporation and a slow cathode erosion.

Pulsed atmospheric arc technology improves the arc stability at low electric currents, maximizes the discharge volume, and together with it the production of reactive species for plasma activation, while at the same time reducing the size of the driving high voltage electronics. These factors make it economically very attractive for industrial applications.

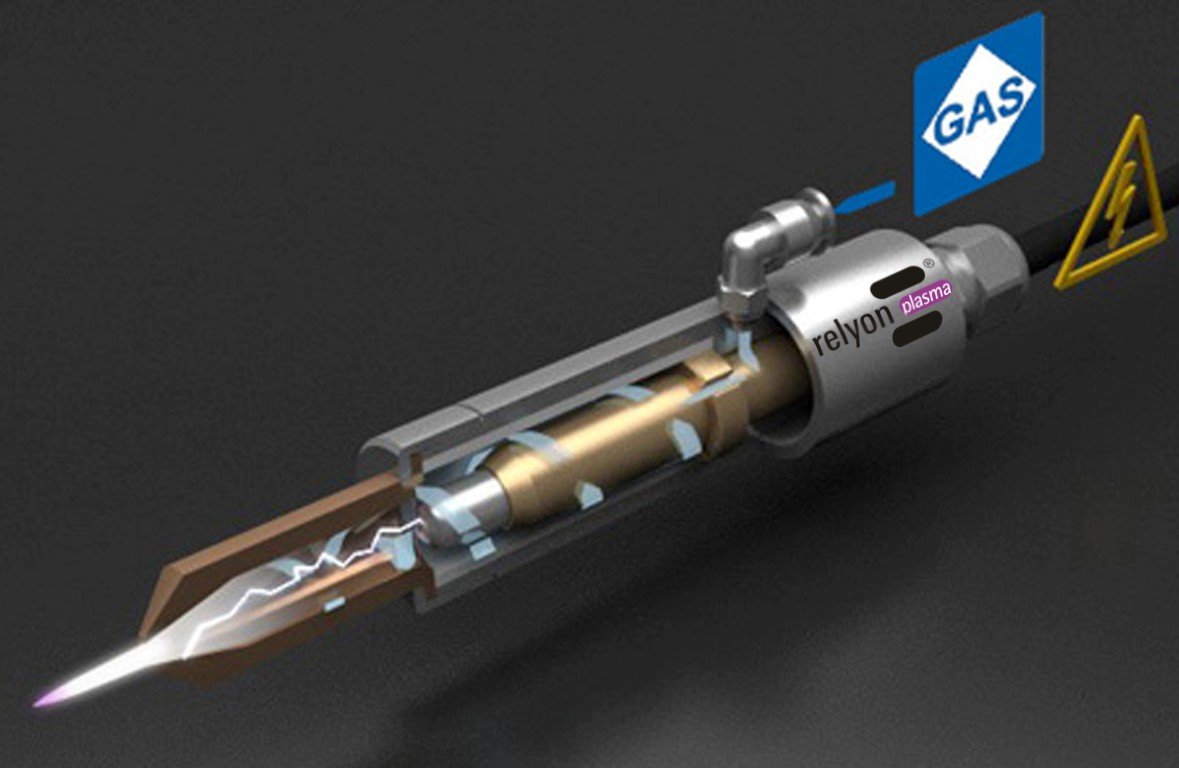
Typical generator of an atmospheric pressure plasma based on a high voltage electric arc discharge. The arc is burning between the inner anode, biased with high voltage, and the grounded outer cathode. The vortex airflow stabilizes the arc and expels the plasma through a hole in the cathode.

There are two ways of using electric arcs for surface activation: non-transferred and transferred electric arcs. In the non-transferred technique, both electrodes are part of the plasma source. One of them also acts as a gas nozzle producing a stream of plasma. After the plasma stream leaves the arc region, the ions recombine quickly, leaving the hot gas having high concentrations of chemically active hydrogen, nitrogen and oxygen atoms and compounds, which is also called remote plasma. The temperature of this gas stream is of the order of 200 – 500 °C. The gas is very reactive allowing high surface treatment speeds when only a short-time contact with the substrate is sufficient to achieve the activation effect. This gas can activate all materials, including temperature-sensitive plastics. Moreover, it is electrically neutral and free from electric potentials, which is important for activation of sensitive electronics.

In the transferred technique of using the electric arcs, the substrate itself plays the role of the cathode. In this case, the substrate is subject not only to the reactive chemical species, but also to their ions with energies of up to 10 – 20 eV, to high temperatures reaching within the cathode spots 3000 °C, and to UV light. These additional factors lead to even greater activation speeds. This treatment method is suitable for conductive substrates such as metals. It reduces metal oxides by their reactions with hydrogen species and leaves the surface free from organic contaminants. Moreover, the fast moving multiple cathode spots create a microstructure on the substrate improving mechanical binding of the adhesive.

=== Corona discharge ===
Corona discharges appear at atmospheric pressures in strongly non-uniform electric fields. Sharp edges of high voltage electrodes produce such fields in their vicinity. When the field in the rest space is negligible – this happens at large distances to the electric grounds – the corona discharge can be ignited. Otherwise, the high voltage electrodes may spark to the ground.

Depending on the polarity of the high voltage electrode one distinguishes negative corona, formed around the cathode, and positive corona, formed around the anode. Negative corona is similar to the Townsend discharge, where the electrons, emitted by the cathode, accelerate in the electric field, ionize the gas in collisions with its atoms and molecules releasing more electrons, and thus creating an avalanche. Secondary processes include electron emission from the cathode and photoionization within the gas volume. Negative corona creates a uniform plasma glowing around the sharp edges of the electrodes. On the other hand, electrons initiating the avalanches in the positive corona are produced by the photoionization of the gas, surrounding the high voltage anode. The photons are emitted in the more active region of the anode vicinity. Then the electron avalanches propagate towards the anode. The plasma of the positive corona consists out of many constantly moving filaments.

Corona discharges produce electric currents of the order of 1 – 100 μA at high voltages of the order of several kV. These currents and the corresponding discharge power are low comparing to the currents and the power of the arc and the dielectric barrier discharges. However, the advantage of the corona discharge is simplicity of the DC high voltage electronics. While electric sparks limit the high voltage, and thus the corona power, the latter can be further increased with a help of pulse-periodic high voltages. However, this complicates the high voltage system.

=== Dielectric barrier discharge ===
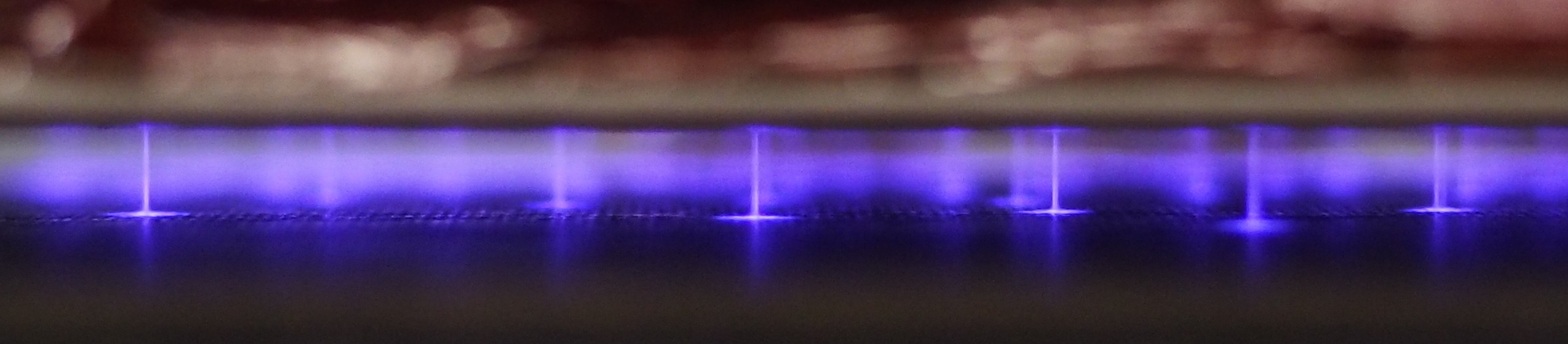
A dielectric barrier discharge at 30 kHz in air between metal electrodes separated by two dielectric mica sheets with a gap of 4 mm. The "foot" of the discharge is the charge accumulation on the barrier surface.

Dielectric barrier discharge occurs between two electrodes separated by a dielectric. Due to the presence of the dielectric barrier, such plasma sources operate only with sine-wave or pulsed high voltages. The physical principles of the discharge do not limit the operating frequency range. The typical frequencies of commonly used solid-state high voltage supplies are 0.05 – 500 kHz. The voltage amplitudes of the order of 5 – 20 kV produce electric currents in the range of 10 – 100 mA. The power of the dielectric barrier discharge is significantly higher than that of the corona discharge, but smaller comparing to the arc discharge. The discharge generally consists of multiple micro-discharges, although in some cases uniform discharges are created too. To increase the uniformity and the discharge gap in the case of VBDB, a pre-ionization system can be used.

Other types of DBD used for functionalization are plasma jets. The processed area is smaller compared with the surface or volume DBD discharges. Micro plasma jets produced in capillary tubes with less than 1μm diameter tip are ultrafine atmospheric pressure plasma jets and proved to be great tools in micro-size processing and functionalization of materials such as carbon nanotubes or polymers.

=== Piezoelectric direct discharge ===
Piezoelectric direct discharge can be considered as a special technical realization of the dielectric barrier discharge, which combines the alternating current high voltage generator, high voltage electrode and the dielectric barrier into a single element. Namely, the high voltage is generated with a piezo-transformer, the secondary circuit of which acts also as the high voltage electrode. Since the piezoelectric material of the transformer, such as lead zirconate titanate, is often a dielectric, the produced electric discharge resembles properties of the dielectric barrier discharge. In addition, when operated in far from the electric ground, it also produces corona discharges on the sharp edges of the piezo-transformer.

Due to the unique construction principles, the piezoelectric barrier discharge is the economic and compact source of the dielectric barrier and corona plasmas. Although its power is limited to about 10 W per unit, the low costs and small sizes of the units allow construction of large arrays optimized for particular applications.

=== Further types of plasmas ===
Plasmas suitable for surface activation were also created using inductive heating with RF and microwave frequencies, spark discharges, resistive barrier discharges and various types of micro-discharges.

== Physical and chemical activation mechanisms ==
The goal of the plasma generators is to convert the electric energy into the energy of charged and neutral particles – electrons, ions, atoms and molecules – which then would produce large quantities of chemical compounds of hydrogen, nitrogen and oxygen, in particular short-lived highly reactive species. Bombardment of the substrate with all constituent plasma species cleans and chemically activates the surface. In addition, at the contact points of discharge filaments the surface can locally reach high temperatures. This modifies the topography of the surface improving mechanical binding of the adhesive.

=== Processes within the plasma volume ===
At the atmospheric pressure, the high collision frequency between the electrons and the gas molecules precludes the electrons from reaching high energies. Typical electron energies are of the order of 1 eV except for the electrode layers of 10 – 30 μm thickness where they can reach 10 – 20 eV. Due to the low electric currents of individual filaments in corona and dielectric barrier discharges, the gas present within the discharge volume does not reach thermal equilibrium with the electrons and remains cold. Its temperature rises typically only by up to a few 10 °C above the room temperature. On the other hand, due to the high electric currents of the arc discharge, the whole arc volume thermally equilibrates with the electrons reaching temperatures of 6,000 – 12,000 °C. However, after leaving the arc volume, this gas quickly cools down to a few 100 °C before it contacts the substrate.

Although it is not correct to speak of temperatures of non-equilibrium electron and ion gases, the temperature concept is illustrative of the physical conditions of the discharges, as the temperature defines the average energy of the particles. The average electron energy of 1 eV, realized typically within the plasma volume, is equal to average electron energy at temperatures of 10,000 °C. In the thin cathode and anode layers, the ions and the electrons reach average energies up to 10 times higher, corresponding to temperatures of 100,000 °C. At the same time, the molecular gas can remain cold.

Chemical reactions in humid air initiated by electric discharges at atmospheric pressure.

Due to the high electron-ion and electron-molecule collision energies, the plasma volume acts as an efficient chemical reactor enabling fast production of chemical compounds of hydrogen, nitrogen and oxygen. Among those, the short-lived highly reactive species are the main agents of the plasma activation of surfaces. They include atomic H, N and O species, OH and ON radicals, ozone, nitrous and nitric acids, as well as various other molecules in metastable excited states. Moreover, when the discharge directly contacts the substrate, the ions of these species as well as the electrons, both having high energies, bombard the surface.

=== Surface processes ===
Plasma of the atmospheric discharges or its product gas, rich with highly reactive chemical species, initiates a multitude of physical and chemical processes upon contact with the surface. It efficiently removes organic surface contaminants, reduces metal oxides, creates a mechanical microstructure on the surface and deposits functional chemical groups. All of these effects can be adjusted by selecting discharge types, their parameters and the working gas. Following processes result in surface activation:

- Ultra-fine cleaning. Reactive chemical species efficiently oxidize organic surface contaminants, converting them into carbon dioxide and water, which evaporate from the surface, leaving it in ultra-fine clean state.
- Removal of weak boundary layers. Plasma removes surface layers with the lowest molecular weight, at the same time it oxidises the uppermost atomic layer of the polymer.
- Cross-linking of surface molecules. Oxygen radicals (and UV radiation, if present) help break up bonds and promote the three-dimensional cross bonding of molecules.
- Reduction of metal oxides. Plasma discharges, ignited in the forming gas, typically containing 5 % of hydrogen and 95 % of nitrogen, produce large quantities of reactive hydrogen species. By contact with oxidized metal surfaces, they react with metal oxides reducing them to metal atoms and water. This process is particularly efficient in electric arcs burning directly on the substrate surface. It leaves the surface clean from the oxides and the contaminants.
- Modification of the surface topography. Electric discharges having direct contact with the substrate erode the substrate surface on the micrometer scale. This creates microstructures that are filled by the adhesives due to the capillary action, improving the mechanical binding of the adhesives.
- Deposition of functional chemical groups. Short-lived chemical species, produced within the plasma volume, as well as the ions, produced within the thin layer, where the discharge contacts the surface, bombard the substrate initiating a number of chemical reactions. Reactions depositing functional chemical groups onto the substrate surface are in many cases the most important mechanism of plasma activation. In the case of plastics, usually having low surface energy, polar OH and ON groups significantly increase the surface energy, improving the surface wettability by the adhesives. In particular, this increases the strength of the dispersive adhesion. Moreover, by employing specialized working gases, which produce chemical species that can form strong chemical bonds with both the substrate surface and the adhesive, one can achieve very strong bonding between chemically dissimilar materials.

Balance of the chemical reactions on the substrate surface depends on the plasma gas composition, velocity of the gas flow, as well as the temperature. The effect of the latter two factors depends on the probability of the reaction. Here one distinguishes two regimes. In a diffusion regime, with a high reaction probability, the speed of the reaction depends on the velocity of the gas flow, but does not depend on the gas temperature. In the other, kinetic regime, with a low reaction probability, the speed of the reaction depends strongly on the gas temperature according to the Arrhenius equation.

== Surface characterization methods ==
One of the main objectives of the plasma activation is to increase the surface energy. The latter is characterized by the wettability of the surface—the ability of the liquid to cover the surface. There are several methods to assess the wettability of the surface:

- In the wetting tension test, several liquids of different surface energies are applied to the surface. The liquid with the lowest surface energy, which wets the tested surface, defines the surface energy of the latter.
- A drop of liquid with known surface energy, e.g. distilled water, is applied to the tested surface. The contact angle of the liquid drop surface, with respect to the substrate surface, determines the substrate surface energy.
- A defined amount of distilled water is spilled on the surface. The area covered by the water determines the surface energy.
- A drop of distilled water is placed on the surface, which is being tilted. The maximum tilt angle of the surface with respect to the horizontal plane, at which the drop is still held in place, determines the surface energy.
