= Charles H. DePuy (chemist) =

American chemist

- Born: September 10, 1927; Detroit, Michigan
- Died: March 14, 2013 (aged 85); Boulder, Colorado
- Known for: Flowing afterglow
- Awards: Sloan Fellow; Guggenheim Fellow von Humboldt Fellow; James Flack Norris Award; AAAS; National Academy of Sciences
- Scientific career
- Fields: Physical organic chemistry
- Institutions: Iowa State University; University of Colorado
- Doctoral advisor: William von Eggers Doering

Charles Herbert DePuy (September 10, 1927 – March 14, 2013) was an American chemist known for his work in gas phase organic ion chemistry.

== Early life and education ==
Charles H. DePuy was born in Detroit, Michigan, on September 10, 1927, but did not live there long. His father was an architectural engineer who supervised the construction of post office buildings throughout the southeastern United States and for a time in the US Virgin Islands. In 1942, his father was transferred to Oakland, California to supervise the fortification of government buildings against anticipated attack.

Depuy enrolled at the University of California, Berkeley at age 16, but was drafted and served for 13 months as a hospital laboratory technician. He returned to Berkeley and graduated in 1948.

He enrolled in at Columbia University and began his graduate work in physical organic chemistry with William von Eggers Doering. He moved with Doering to Yale University and received his M.S. degree from Columbia in 1952 and Ph.D. from Yale in 1953. He took a postdoctoral position at the University of California, Los Angeles in the lab of Donald J. Cram.

== Academic career ==
DePuy joined faculty at Iowa State University and rose quickly to the position of full professor. In 1963, he moved to the University of Colorado, Boulder where he spent the rest of his career.

His research spanned both gas and solution phase physical organic chemistry. He is best known for his development of the flowing afterglow technique for the study of gas phase ion molecule reactions. He developed methods for gas phase hydrogen-deuterium exchange, substitution and elimination reactions, and comparisons of gas and solution phase reaction energetics.

He was the author of “Introduction to Organic Chemistry” (with Douglas Applequist and Kenneth L. Rinehart) and “Exercises in Organic Spectroscopy” with Robert H. Shapiro.

== Awards ==
DePuy was n National Institutes of Health Senior Postdoctoral Fellow, Alfred Sloan Fellow, and Guggenheim Fellow, Alexander von Humboldt Fellow. He received the Colorado Section of the American Chemical Society Gold Medallion Award, and the American Chemical Society James Flack Norris Award. He was a member of the American Academy of Arts and Sciences and National Academy of Sciences.
