= Anodic bonding =

Wafer bonding process in semiconductor manufacturing

Anodic bonding is a wafer bonding process to seal glass to either silicon or metal without introducing an intermediate layer. Anodic bonding is commonly used to seal glass to silicon wafers in electronics and microfluidics. Anodic bonding, also known as field assisted bonding or electrostatic sealing, is mostly used for connecting silicon/glass and metal/glass through electric fields. The requirements for anodic bonding are clean and even wafer surfaces and atomic contact between the bonding substrates through a sufficiently powerful electrostatic field. Also necessary is the use of borosilicate glass containing a high concentration of alkali ions. The coefficient of thermal expansion (CTE) of the processed glass needs to be similar to those of the bonding partner.

Anodic bonding can be applied with glass wafers at temperatures of 250 to 400 °C or with sputtered glass at 400 °C. Structured borosilicate glass layers may also be deposited by plasma-assisted e-beam evaporation.

This procedure is mostly used for hermetic encapsulation of micro-mechanical silicon elements. The glass substrate encapsulation protects from environmental influences, e.g. humidity or contamination. Further, other materials are used for anodic bonding with silicon, i.e. low-temperature cofired ceramics (LTCC).

== Overview ==
Anodic bonding on silicon substrates is divided into bonding using a thin sheet of glass (a wafer) or a glass layer that is deposited onto the silicon using a technique such as sputtering. The glass wafer is often sodium-containing Borofloat or Pyrex glasses. With an intermediate glass layer, it is also possible to connect two silicon wafers. The glass layers are deposited by sputtering, spin-on of a glass solution or vapor deposition upon the processed silicon wafer. The thickness of these layers range from one to a few micrometers with spin-on glass layers needing 1 μm or less. Hermetic seals of silicon to glass using an aluminum layer with thickness of 50 to 100 nm can reach strengths of 18.0 MPa. This method enables burying electrically isolated conductors in the interface. Bonding of thermally oxidized wafers without a glass layer is also possible.

The procedural steps of anodic bonding are divided into the following:

1. Contact substrates
2. Heating up substrates
3. Bonding by the application of an electrostatic field
4. Cooling down the wafer stack

with a process characterized by the following variables:

- bond voltage U_{B}
- bond temperature T_{B}
- current limitation I_{B}

The typical bond strength is between 10 and 20 MPa according to pull tests, higher than the fracture strength of glass.

Differing coefficients of thermal expansion pose challenges for anodic bonding. Excessive mismatch in the coefficients of thermal expansion can harm the bond through intrinsic material tensions and cause disruptions in the bonding materials. The use of sodium-containing glasses such as Borofloat or Pyrex serve to reduce the mismatch. These glasses have a similar CTE to silicon in the range of applied temperature, commonly up to 400 °C.

== History ==
Anodic bonding is first mentioned by Wallis and Pomerantz in 1969. It is applied as bonding of silicon wafers to sodium containing glass wafers under the influence of an applied electric field. This method is used up to date as encapsulation of sensors with electrically conducted glasses.

== Procedural steps of anodic bonding ==
=== Pretreatment of the substrates ===
The anodic bonding procedure is able to bond hydrophilic and hydrophobic silicon surfaces equally effectively. The roughness of the surface should be less than 10 nm and free of contamination on the surface for the procedure to work properly. Even though anodic bonding is relatively tolerant to contaminations, a widely established cleaning procedure RCA takes place to remove any surface impurities.

The glass wafer can also be chemically etched or powder blasted for creating small cavities, where MEMS devices can be accommodated.

Further mechanisms supporting the bonding process of not completely inert anodic materials can be the planarization or polishing of surfaces and the ablation of the surface layer by electrochemical etching.

=== Contact the substrates ===
The wafers that meet the requirements are put into atomic contact. As soon as contact is first established, the bonding process starts close to the cathode and spreads in fronts to the edges, the process taking several minutes. The anodic bonding procedure is based on a glass wafer that is usually placed above a silicon wafer. An electrode is in contact with the glass wafer either through a needle or a full area cathode electrode.

If using a needle electrode, the bond spreads radially to the outside which makes it impossible to trap air between the surfaces. The radius of the bonded area is approximately proportional to the square root of time elapsed during the procedure. Below temperatures of 350 to 400 °C and a bond voltage of 500 to 1000 V, this method is not very effective nor reliable.

The use of a full area cathode electrode shows bond reactions over the whole interface after powering up the potential. This is the result of a homogeneous electric field distribution at temperatures of around 300 °C and bond voltage of 250 V. Using thin deposited glass layers the voltages needed can be significantly reduced.

=== Heating and bonding by application of electrostatic field ===
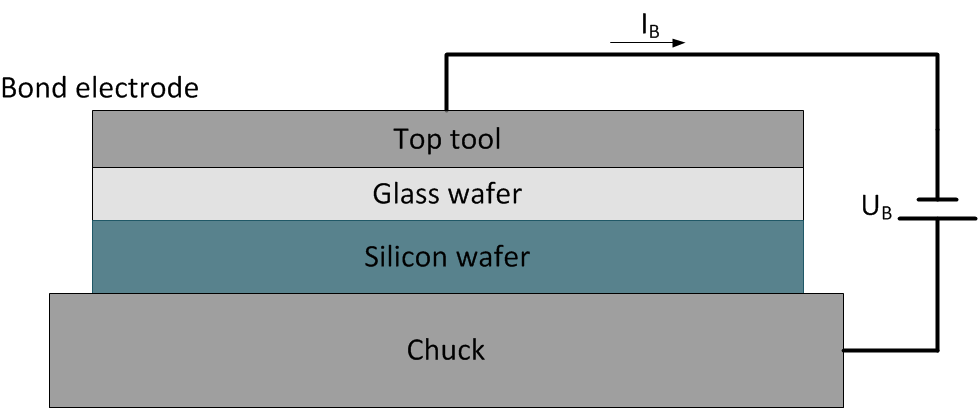
Scheme of anodic bonding procedure. The top tool works as a cathode and the chuck as anode.

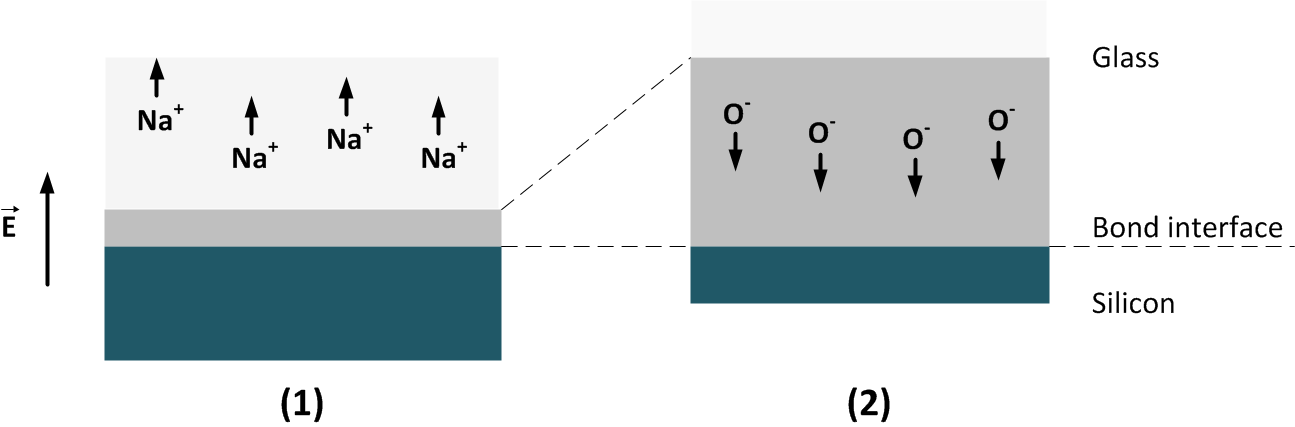
Ion drifting in bond glass influenced by electrostatic field. (1) Formation of depletion zone (gray) through Na^{+} drifting. (2) Drift of O^{−} ions in the depletion zone.

The wafers are placed between the chuck and the top tool used as a bond electrode at temperatures between 200 and 500 °C (compare to image "scheme of anodic bonding procedure") but below the softening point of glass (glass transition temperature). The higher the temperature the better is the mobility of positive ions in glass.

The applied electrical potential is several hundred volts. This causes a diffusion of sodium ions (Na^{+}) out of the bond interface to the back side of the glass to the cathode. Combined with humidity, that results in the formation of NaOH. The high voltage helps to support the drifting of the positive ions in glass to the cathode. The diffusion is, consistent with the Boltzmann distribution, exponentially related to the temperature. The glass (NaO_{2}) with its remaining oxygen ions (O^{2−}) is negatively volume charged at the bonding surface compared to the silicon (compare to figure "ion drifting in bond glass" (1)). This is based on the depletion of Na^{+} ions.

Unlike e.g. aluminium, silicon is an inert anode. Thus no ions drift out of the silicon into the glass during the bonding process. This affects a positive volume charge in the silicon wafer on the opposite side. As a result, a high-impedance depletion region a few micrometres (μm) thick develops at the bond barrier in the glass wafer. In the gap between silicon and glass the bond voltage drops. The bonding process starts; it is a combination of electrostatic and electrochemical processes.

The electrical field intensity in the depletion region is so high that the oxygen ions drift to the bond interface and pass out to react with the silicon to form SiO_{2} (compare to figure "ion drifting in bond glass" (2)). Based on the high field intensity in the depletion region or in the gap at the interface, both wafer surfaces are pressed together at a specific bond voltage and bond temperature. The temperature is maintained at 200 to 500 °C for about 5 to 20 minutes. Typically, the bonding or sealing time is longer when temperature and voltage are reduced. The pressure is applied to create intimate contact between the surfaces to ensure good electrical conduction across the wafer pair, and thus between the surfaces of the bonding partners. The thin oxide layer formed between the bond surfaces, siloxane (Si-O-Si), ensures an irreversible connection between the bonding partners.

If using thermally oxidized wafers without a glass layer, the diffusion of OH^{−} and H^{+} ions instead of Na^{+} ions leads to the bonding.

=== Cooling down the substrate ===
After the bonding process, slow cooling over several minutes has to take place. This can be supported by purging with an inert gas. The cooling time depends on the difference of CTE for the bonded materials: the higher the CTE difference, the longer the cooling period.

== Technical specifications ==
Materials	Si-Si; Si-glass; Si-LTCC; Si-glass-PZT ceramics; Metal-glass (Al, Cu, Kovar, Mo, Ni, Invar, ...)
Temperature	Si-glass: > 250 °C; Si-Si (w. intermediate glass layer): > 300 °C; Metal-glass: 200 - 450 °C
Voltage	Si-glass: 300 - 500 V (max. < 2000 V); Metal-glass: 50 - 1500 V
Advantages	Easy technological processes; Generation of stable bonds; Generation of hermetic bonds; Bonding below 450 °C; Low restrictions for Si surface
Drawbacks	Limited allowable CTE difference in bonded materials
Research	Manufacturing process integration; Si-LTCC
