= Serpentine geometry plasma actuator =

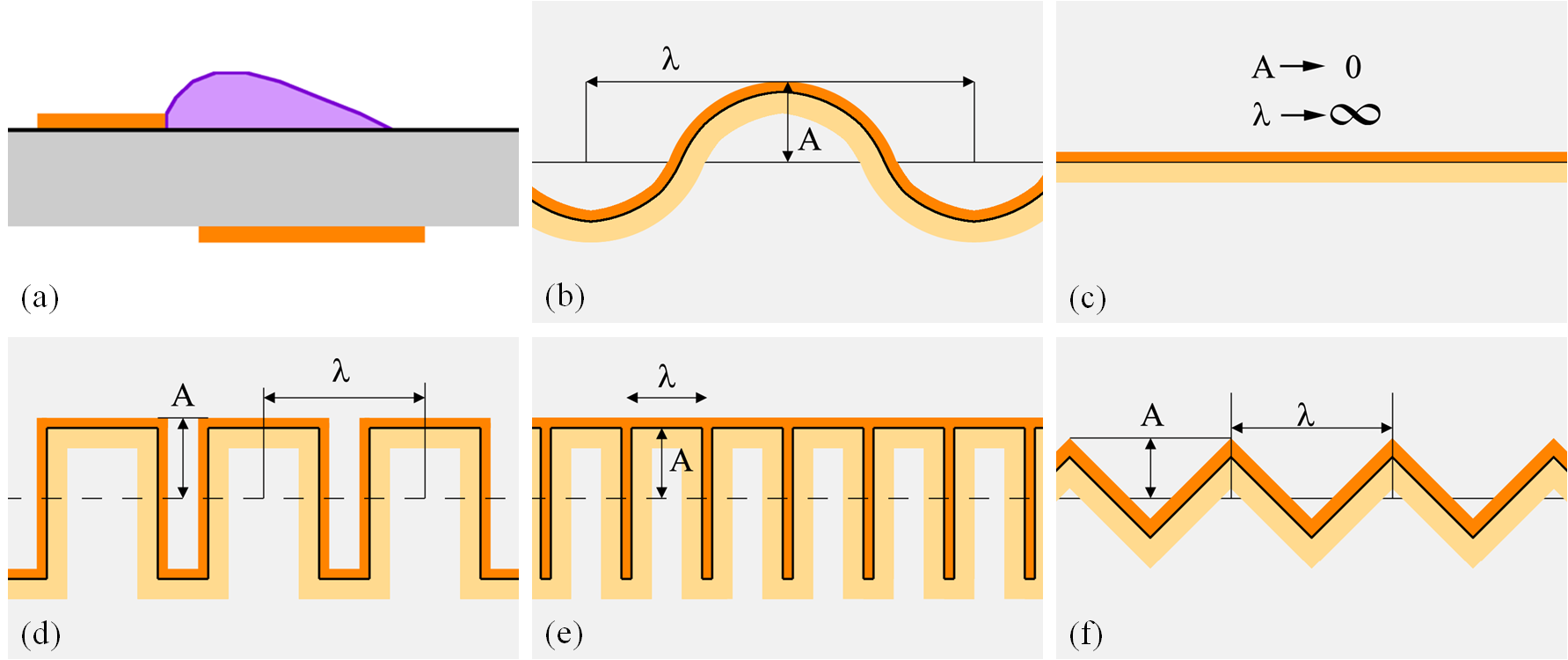
A comparison of different plasma actuator geometries. A) A view of DBD plasma actuators from the side. B) Curved serpentine geometry plasma actuator. C) Traditional (linear) geometry plasma actuator. D-F) Additional serpentine plasma actuator geometries.

The serpentine plasma actuator represents a broad class of plasma actuator. The actuators vary from the standard type in that their electrode geometry has been modified in to be periodic across its span.

== History ==
This class of plasma actuators was developed at the Applied Physics Research Group (APRG) at the University of Florida in 2008 by Subrata Roy for the purpose of controlling laminar and turbulent boundary layer flows. Since then, APRG has continued to characterize and develop uses for this class of plasma actuators. Several patents resulted from the early work on serpentine geometry plasma actuators.

In 2013, these actuators started to get broader attention in the scientific press, and several articles were written about these actuators, including articles in AIP's EurekAlert, Inside Science and various blogs.

== Current research and operating mechanisms ==
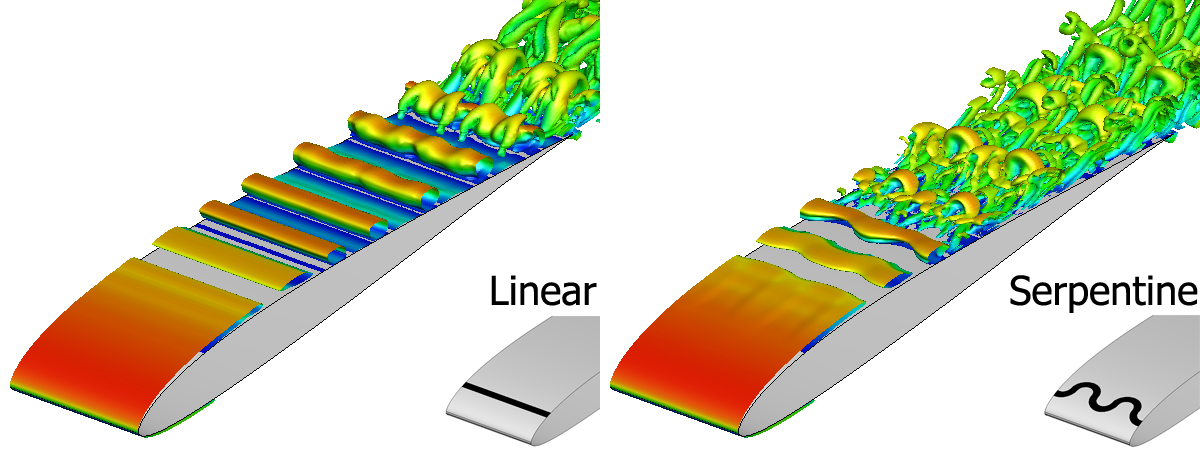
Comparison of turbulent flow structures over an airfoil when a pulsed linear (left) and a serpentine (right) plasma actuator are used to control the flow.

Serpentine plasma actuators (like other Dielectric Barrier Discharge actuators, i.e. plasma actuators) are able to induce an atmospheric plasma and introduce an electrohydrodynamic body force to a fluid. This body force can be used to implement flow control, and there are a range of potential applications, including drag reduction for aircraft and flow stabilization in combustion chambers.

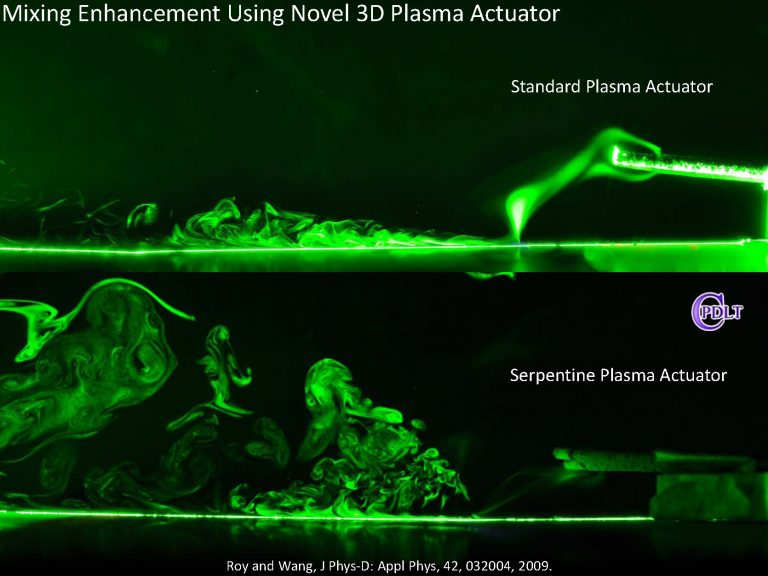
Flow visualization comparison between flow structures generated by linear (top) and serpentine (bottom) geometry plasma actuators

The important distinction between serpentine plasma actuators and more traditional geometries is that the geometry of the electrodes has been modified in order to be periodic across its span. As the electrode has been made periodic, the resulting plasma and body force are also spanwise periodic. With this spanwise periodicity, three-dimensional flow effects can be induced in the flow, which cannot be done with more traditional plasma actuator geometries.

It is thought that the introduction of three-dimensional flow effects allow for the plasma actuators to apply much greater levels of control authority as they allow for the plasma actuators to project onto a greater range of physical mechanisms (such as boundary layer streaks or secondary instabilities of the Tollmien-Schlichting wave). Recent work indicate that these plasma actuators may have a significant impact on controlling laminar and transitional flows on a flat plate. In addition, the serpentine actuator has been experimentally demonstrated to increase lift, decrease drag and generate controlling rolling moments when applied to aircraft wing geometries.

With the greater level of control authority that these plasma actuators may potentially possess, there is currently research being performed at several labs in the United States and in the United Kingdom looking to apply these actuators for real world applications. Recent numerical work predicted significant turbulent drag reduction by collocating serpentine plasma actuators in a pattern to modify energetic modes of transitional flow.

== See also ==
- Plasma actuator
- Wingless Electromagnetic Air Vehicle
- Applied Physics Research Group
- University of Florida
- University of Florida College of Engineering
