= Subrata Roy (scientist) =

American inventor, educator, and scientist

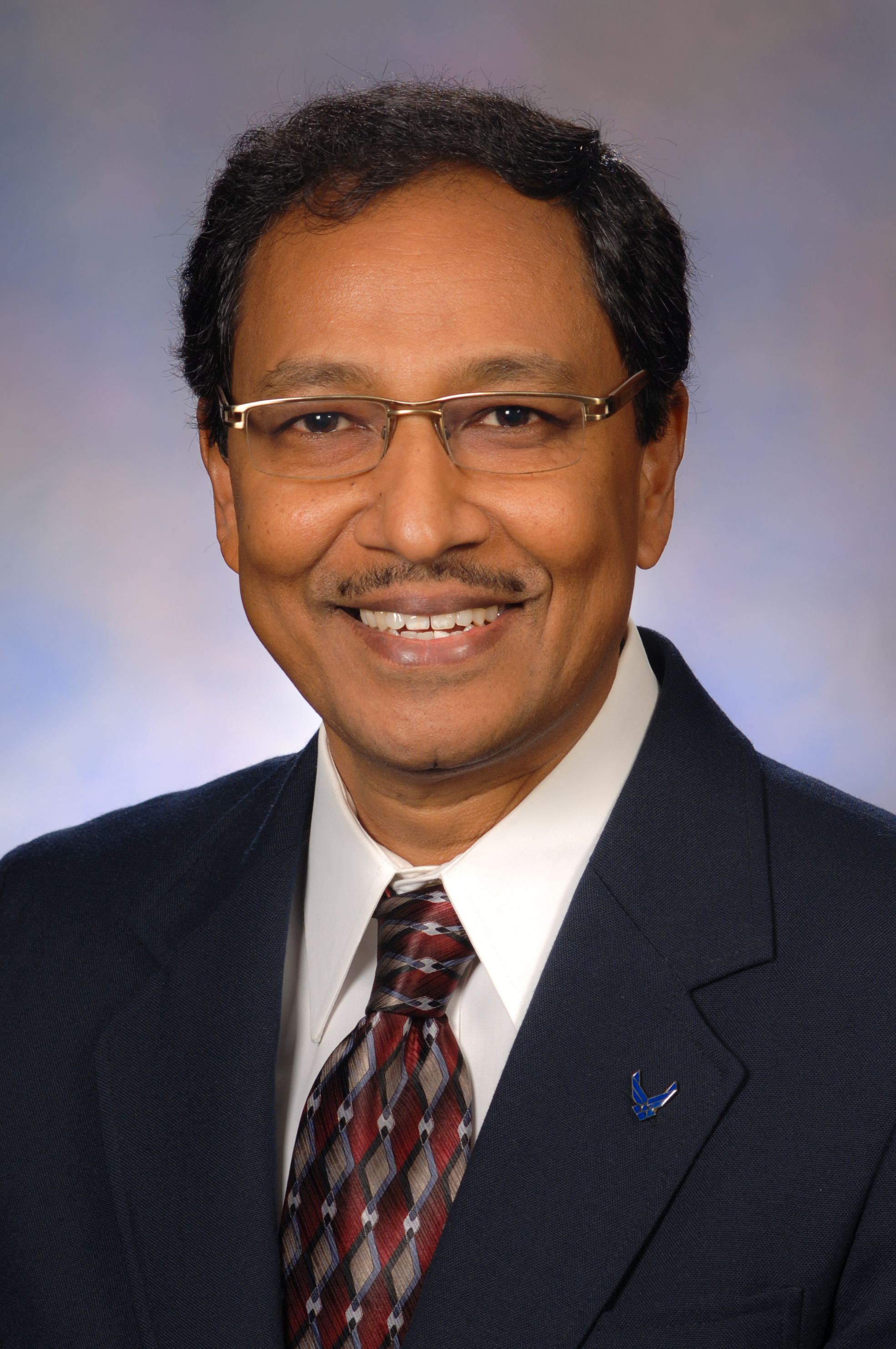
- Education: Jadavpur University B.M.E.; University of Tennessee, Knoxville Ph.D.
- Known for: Flow Control using novel plasma actuators; and micro and nanofluidics.
- Awards: Florida Inventors Hall of Fame; Fellow, National Academy of Inventors; Distinguished Visiting Fellow, Royal Academy of Engineering
- Scientific career
- Fields: Computational fluid dynamics (non-relativistic, non-quantum, Newtonian); plasma physics; flow control; turbulence; hypersonic speed; microfluidics; nanofluidics; nanotechnology
- Institutions: University of Florida; Kettering University; University of Tennessee; University of Manchester; Indian Institute of Technology Bombay
- Website: mae.ufl.edu/people/profiles/subrata-roy/

Subrata Roy is an American inventor, educator, and scientist known for his work in plasma-based flow control and plasma-based self-sterilizing technology. He is a professor of Mechanical and Aerospace Engineering at the University of Florida and the founding director of the Applied Physics Research Group at the University of Florida. He is also the President and the founder of SurfPlasma Inc., a biotechnology company in Gainesville, Florida.

== Biography ==
Subrata Roy earned his Bachelor's degree in Mechanical Engineering from Jadavpur University, Kolkata, India in 1984 and his Ph.D. in engineering science from the University of Tennessee in Knoxville, TN in 1994. Roy was a senior research scientist at Computational Mechanics Corporation in Knoxville, Tennessee, and then professor of mechanical engineering at the Kettering University up to 2006. In 2006, Roy joined the University of Florida as a faculty member of the Department of Mechanical and Aerospace Engineering. He is a professor of Mechanical and Aerospace Engineering and the founding director of the Applied Physics Research Group at the University of Florida. He has also worked as a visiting professor at the University of Manchester and the Indian Institute of Technology Bombay.

== Scientific work ==
Subrata Roy's research and scientific work encompasses computational fluid dynamics (CFD), plasma physics, heat transfer, magnetohydrodynamics, electric propulsion, and micro/nanoscale flows. In 2003, Roy incorporated Knudsen's theory that handles surface collisions of molecules by diffusive and specular reflections into hydrodynamic models, which has been used in shale gas seepage studies. In 2006, Roy invented the Wingless Electromagnetic Air Vehicle (WEAV) which was included in Scientific American in 2008 as the world's first wingless, electromagnetically driven air vehicle design. Roy is known for introducing various novel designs and configurations of plasma actuators for applications in mitigation of flow drag related fuel consumption, noise reduction, and active film cooling of turbine blades and propulsion. These designs and configurations include serpentine geometry plasma actuators, fan geometry plasma actuators, micro-scale actuators, multibarrier plasma actuators, and plasma actuated channels of atmospheric plasma actuators. Roy also led multidisciplinary research on innovating eco-friendly ways of microorganism decontamination using plasma reactors.

Roy served as the Technical Discipline Chair for the 36th AIAA Thermophysics Conference in 2003, the 48th Aerospace Sciences Meeting (for Thermophysics) in 2010, the AIAA SciTech Plasma Dynamics and Lasers Conference in 2016, and served as the Forum Technical Chair for AIAA SciTech in 2018. Roy served (2005–2007) as an Associate Editor of the Journal of Fluids Engineering and served (2012–2017) as an Academic Editor of PLOS One. Roy serves as a nation appointed member to the NATO Science and Technology Organisation working group on plasma actuator technologies; a member of the editorial board of Scientific Reports-Nature; and, an Associate Editor of Frontiers in Physics, Frontiers in Astronomy and Space Sciences, and Journal of Fluid Flow, Heat and Mass Transfer. Roy is an inducted member of the Florida Inventors Hall of Fame, Fellow of the National Academy of Inventors, an inducted member of the Academy of Science, Engineering and Medicine of Florida, a Distinguished Visiting Fellow of the Royal Academy of Engineering, a Fellow of the Royal Aeronautical Society, a lifetime member and Fellow of the American Society of Mechanical Engineers, and an Associated Fellow of the American Institute of Aeronautics and Astronautics.

== Honors ==
- Florida Inventors Hall of Fame
- Fellow, National Academy of Inventors
- Distinguished Visiting Fellow, Royal Academy of Engineering
- Member, Academy of Science, Engineering, and Medicine of Florida
- Fellow, Royal Aeronautical Society
- Lifetime Fellow, American Society of Mechanical Engineers
- Space Act Award 2016 NASA
