= Plasmalysis =

Chemical process in a plasma

Plasmalysis is a electrochemical process that requires a voltage source. On the one hand, it describes the plasma-chemical dissociation of organic and inorganic compounds (e.g. C-H and N-H compounds) in interaction with a thermal/non-thermal plasma between two electrodes. On the other hand, it describes the synthesis, i.e. the combination of two or more elements to form a new molecule (e.g. methane synthesis/methanation). Plasmalysis is an artificial word made of plasma and lysis (Greek λύσις, "[dissolution]").

== Thermal/non-thermal plasma ==
Thermal plasmas. can be technically generated, for example, by inductive coupling of high-frequency fields in the MHz range (ICP: Inductively coupled plasma) or by direct current coupling (arc discharges). A thermal plasma is characterized by the fact that electrons, ions and neutral particles are in thermodynamic equilibrium. For atmospheric-pressure plasmas, the temperatures in thermal plasmas are usually above 6000 K. This corresponds to average kinetic energies of less than 1 eV.

Nonthermal plasmas are found in low-pressure arc discharges, such as fluorescent lamps, in dielectrically barrier discharges (DBD), such as ozone tubes, in microwave plasmas (plasma torches, i.e. PLexc oder MagJet) or in GHz-plasmajets. A non-thermal plasma shows a significant difference between the electron and gas temperature. For example, the electron temperature can be several 10,000 K, which corresponds to average kinetic energies of more than 1 eV while a gas temperature close to room temperature is measured. Despite their low temperature, such plasmas can trigger chemical reactions and excitation states via electron collisions. Pulsed coronal and dielectrically impeded discharges belong to the family of nonthermal plasmas. Here the electrons are much hotter (several eV) than the ions/neutral gas particles (room temperature).

== Technical aspects ==
To generate a nonthermal plasma at atmospheric pressure, a working gas (molecular or inert gas, e.g. air, nitrogen, argon, helium) is passed through an electric field. Electrons originating from ionization processes can be accelerated in this field to trigger impact ionization processes. If more free electrons are produced during this process than are lost, a discharge can build up. The degree of ionization in technically used plasmas is usually very low, typically a few per mille or less. The electrical conductivity generated by these free charge carriers is used to couple in electrical power. When colliding with other gas atoms or molecules, the free electrons can transfer their energy to them and thus generate highly reactive species that act on the material to be treated (gaseous, liquid, solid). The electron energy is sufficient to split covalent bonds in organic molecules. The energy required to split single bonds is in the range of about 1.5 - 6.2 eV, for double bonds in the range of about 4.4 - 7.4 eV and for triple bonds in the range of 8.5 - 11.2 eV . For gases that can also be used as process gases, dissociation energies are e.g. 5.7 eV (O_{2}) and 9.8 eV (N_{2})

== Applications of atmospheric pressure plasmas ==
Atmospheric-pressure plasmas have been used for a variety of industrial applications, including volatile organic compound (VOC) removal, exhaust gas emission treatment and polymer surface and food treatment. For decades, non-thermal plasmas have also been used to generate ozone for water purification. Atmospheric pressure plasmas can be characterized primarily by a large number of electrical discharges in which the majority of the electrical energy is used to generate energetic electrons. These energetic electrons produce chemically excited species - free radicals and ions - and additional electrons by dissociation, excitation and ionization of background gas molecules by electron impact. These excited species in turn oxidize, reduce or decompose the molecules, such as wastewater or biomethane, that are brought into contact with them. Part of the electrical energy is converted into chemical energy. Plasmalysis can thus be used to store energy, for example in the plasma analysis of ammonium from waste water or liquid fermentation residue, which produces hydrogen and nitrogen. The hydrogen thus produced can serve as an energy carrier for a hydrogen economy.

== Dissociation mechanisms of gases and liquids ==
In the following section XH stands for any hydrogen compound, e.g. CH- and NH-compounds.

- Thermal dissociation: gaseous hydrogen molecules are being dissociated at temperatures above 3000 K e.g. in a plasma. At temperatures above 3500 K H_{2} und O_{2} are dissociated.
- electron impact dissociation:
  $e + XH(s,l,g) \rightarrow H(g) + X(s,l,g)$

The density of radicals scales with the electron density and higher gas and electron temperatures (thermal dissociation and electron impact).

- ion impact dissociation:
  $A^+ + XH(g) \rightarrow A^+ + H + X(s,l,g)$
- dissociative electron attachment:
  $e + XH^* \rightarrow X^-(s,l,g) + H(g)$

This process generates negative ions as well as neutral particles. The collision electron is captured by collision excitation. The energy difference between the ground state and the excited state dissociates the molecule. The electron-induced dissociation of water depends on the electron temperature, which influences the ratio of the OH density (n_OH) to the electron density (n_e) significantly. The maximum OH density is reached in the early afterglow when the electron temperature (T_e) is low.

- Photoionisation:
  High-energy photons dissociate molecules
- Solvated electrons:
  Reducing agent in liquid

== Dissociation efficiency of different hydrogen sources ==
=== Water Electrolysis ===
Since the focus is always on the most energy-efficient dissociation of chemical compounds, the benchmark is the energy input of the electrolysis of distilled water (45 kWh/kg_{H_{2}}) as in the following reaction equation:

- $\mathrm{ 2\ H_2O(f) \rightleftharpoons O_2(g) + 2\ H_2(g)} \qquad \Delta H_{R\ 298}^{1bar(a)} = -286\ \mathrm{kJ/mol}$

=== Methane-plasmalysis ===
A particularly efficient way of generating hydrogen (10 kWh/kg_{H_{2}}) is the methane plasmalysis. In this process, methane (e.g. from natural gas) is decomposed in the plasma under oxygen exclusion, forming hydrogen and elemental carbon, as in the following reaction equation:

- $\mathrm{ 2\ CH_4(g) \rightleftharpoons C_2(f) + 4\ H_2(g)} \qquad \Delta H_{R\ 298}^{1bar(a)} = +75\ \mathrm{kJ/mol}$

Methane plasmalysis offers, among other things, the possibility of decentralized decarbonization of natural gas or, if biogas is used, also the realization of a CO_{2} sink, whereby, in contrast to the CCS process commonly used to date, no gas has to be compressed and stored, but the elemental carbon produced can be bound in product form.

This technology can also be used to prevent the flaring of so-called "flare gases" by using them as a feedstock for the production of hydrogen and carbon.

=== Wastewater-plasmalysis ===
The plasmalysis of wastewater and liquid manure enables hydrogen to be recovered from pollutants contained in the wastewater (ammonium (NH4) or hydrocarbon compounds (COD)). The plasma-catalytic decomposition of ammonia takes place as shown in the following reaction equation:

- $\mathrm{ 2\ NH_3(f) \rightleftharpoons N_2(g) + 3\ H_2(g)} \qquad \Delta H_{R\ 298}^{1bar(a)} = -92\ \mathrm{kJ/mol}$

The treated wastewater is purified in the process. The energy requirement for the production of green hydrogen is approx. 12 kWh/kg_{H_{2}}.

This technology can also be used as ammonia cracking (chemistry) technology for splitting the hydrogen carrier ammonia.

=== Dissociation of hydrogen sulfide ===
Hydrogen sulfide - a component of crude oil and natural gas and a by-product in anaerobic digestion of biomass - is also suitable for plasma-catalytic decomposition to produce hydrogen and elemental sulfur due to its weak binding energy.

- $\mathrm{ H_2S(g) \rightleftharpoons H_2(g) + S(s)} \qquad \Delta H_{R\ 298}^{1bar(a)} = -20,5\ \mathrm{kJ/mol}$

The energy requirement for the production of hydrogen from H_{2}S is approx. 5 kWh/kg_{H_{2}}.

== Reactor geometry ==
It is apparent that both the reactor geometry and the method by which the plasma is generated strongly influence the performance of the system.
