= Plasma medicine =

Field of medical research

Plasma medicine is an emerging field that combines plasma physics, life sciences and clinical medicine. It is being studied in disinfection, healing, cancer, and surgery. Most of the research is in vitro and in animal models.

It uses ionized gas (physical plasma) for medical uses or dental applications. Plasma, often called the fourth state of matter, is an ionized gas containing positive ions and negative ions or electrons, but is approximately charge neutral on the whole. The plasma sources used for plasma medicine are generally low temperature plasmas, and they generate ions, chemically reactive atoms and molecules, and UV-photons. These plasma-generated active species are useful for several bio-medical applications such as sterilization of implants and surgical instruments as well as modifying biomaterial surface properties. Sensitive applications of plasma, like subjecting human body or internal organs to plasma treatment for medical purposes, are also possible. This possibility is being heavily investigated by research groups worldwide under the highly-interdisciplinary research field called "plasma medicine".

== Plasma sources ==
Plasma sources used in plasma medicine are typically "low temperature" plasma sources operated at atmospheric pressure. In this context, low temperature refers to temperatures similar to room temperature, usually slightly above. There is a strict upper limit of 50 °C when treating tissue to avoid burns. The plasmas are only partially ionized, with less than 1 ppm of the gas being charged species, and the rest composed of neutral gas.

=== Dielectric-barrier discharges ===
Dielectric-barrier discharges are a type of plasma source that limits the current using a dielectric that covers one or both electrodes. The DBD was the plasma source used in the mid-1990s in the early groundbreaking work on the biomedical applications of cold plasma. A conventional DBD device comprises two planar electrodes with at least one of them covered with a dielectric material and the electrodes are separated by a small gap which is called the discharge gap. Research has demonstrated that modifying the configuration of the embedded electrode and altering its distribution within the dielectric medium can significantly impact the effectiveness of dielectric barrier discharge (DBD) plasma actuators. The performance characteristics of these actuators can be tuned and optimised by strategically manipulating the electrode's encapsulation and placement throughout the dielectric layer. DBDs are usually driven by high AC voltages with frequencies in the kHz range. In order to use DC and 50/60 Hz power sources investigators developed the Resistive Barrier Discharge (RBD). However, for medical application of DBD devices, the human body itself can serve as one of the two electrodes making it sufficient to devise plasma sources that consist of only one electrode covered with a dielectric such as alumina or quartz. DBD for medical applications such as for the inactivation of bacteria, for treatment of skin diseases and wounds, tumor treatment and disinfection of skin surface are currently under investigation. The treatment usually takes place in the room air. They are generally powered by several kilovolt biases using either AC or pulsed power supplies.

=== Atmospheric pressure plasma jets ===
Atmospheric pressure plasma jets (APPJs) are a collection of plasma sources that use a gas flow to deliver the reactive species generated in the plasma to the tissue or sample. The gas used is usually helium or argon, sometimes with a small amount (< 5%) of O_{2}, H_{2}O or N_{2} mixed in to increase the production of chemically reactive atoms and molecules. The use of a noble gas keeps temperatures low, and makes it simpler to produce a stable discharge. The gas flow also serves to generate a region where room air is in contact with and diffusing in to the noble gas, which is where much of the reactive species are produced.

There is a large variety in jet designs used in experiments. Many APPJs use a dielectric to limit current, just like in a DBD, but not all do. Those that use a dielectric to limit current usually consists of a tube made of quartz or alumina, with a high voltage electrode wrapped around the outside. There can also be a grounded electrode wrapped around the outside of the dielectric tube. Designs that do not use a dielectric to limit the current use a high voltage pin electrode at the center of the quartz tube. These devices all generate ionization waves that begin inside the jet and propagate out to mix with the ambient air. Even though the plasma may look continuous, it is actually a series of ionization waves or "plasma bullets". This ionization wave may or may not treat the tissue being treated. Direct contact of the plasma with the tissue or sample can result in dramatically larger amounts of reactive species, charged species, and photons being delivered to the sample.

One type of design that does not use a dielectric to limit the current is two planar electrodes with a gas flow running between them. In this case, the plasma does not exit the jet, and only the neutral atoms and molecules and photons reach the sample.

Most devices of this type produce thin (mm diameter) plasma jets, larger surfaces can be treated simultaneously by joining many such jets or by multielectrode systems. Significantly larger surfaces can be treated than with an individual jet. Further, the distance between the device and the skin is to a certain degree variable, as the skin is not needed as a plasma electrode, significantly simplifying use on the patient. Low temperature plasma jets have been used in various biomedical applications ranging from the inactivation of bacteria to the killing of cancer cells.

== Applications ==
Plasma medicine can be subdivided into five main fields:

1. Non-thermal atmospheric-pressure direct plasma for medical therapy
2. Plasma-assisted modification of bio-relevant surfaces
3. Plasma-based bio-decontamination and sterilization
4. Plasma-assisted modification of biomolecules, e.g., proteins, carbohydrates, lipids, and amino acids
5. Plasma-assisted prodrug activation

=== Non-thermal atmospheric-pressure plasma ===
One of challenges is the application of non-thermal plasmas directly on the surface of human body or on internal organs. Whereas for surface modification and biological decontamination both low-pressure and atmospheric pressure plasmas can be used, for direct therapeutic applications only atmospheric pressure plasma sources are applicable.

The high reactivity of plasma is a result of different plasma components: electromagnetic radiation (UV/VUV, visible light, IR, high-frequency electromagnetic fields, etc.) on the one hand and ions, electrons and reactive chemical species, primarily radicals, on the other. Besides surgical plasma application like argon plasma coagulation (APC), which is based on high-intensity lethal plasma effects, first and sporadic non-thermal therapeutic plasma applications are documented in literature. However, the basic understanding of mechanisms of plasma effects on different components of living systems is in the early beginning. Especially for the field of direct therapeutic plasma application, a fundamental knowledge of the mechanisms of plasma interaction with living cells and tissue is essential as a scientific basis.

==== Plasma Dermatology ====
The skin offers a convenient target for plasma applications, which partly explains the recent boom in plasma dermatology. The first successes were achieved by German scientists using plasma treatment to heal chronic ulcers. These studies resulted in the development of plasma devices now in clinical use in the European Union.

In the United States, a collaborative group of academic scientists of the Nyheim Plasma Institute of Drexel University and dermatologist-researcher Dr. Peter C. Friedman pioneered the use of plasma to treat precancerous (actinic) keratosis and warts. The same team was able to show promising results in the treatment of hair loss (androgenetic alopecia) with a modified protocol, called indirect plasma treatment.

Successful plasma treatment of actinic keratosis was repeated by a different group in Germany using a different type of plasma device, further demonstrating the value of this technology even when compared to established treatment methods such as topical diclofenac.

There are ongoing clinical trials in dermatology for acne, rosacea, hair loss, and other conditions. The understanding gained from studying plasma treatment of skin diseases, may also help to develop new Plasma Medicine strategies to treat internal organs.

Cold plasma is used to treat chronic wounds. Preliminary results indicate that cold plasma therapy can be more effective than the gold standard.

== Mechanisms ==
Though many positive results have been seen in the experiments, it is not clear what the dominant mechanism of action is for any applications in plasma medicine. The plasma treatment generates reactive oxygen and nitrogen species, which include free radicals. These species include O, O_{3}, OH, H_{2}O_{2}, HO_{2}, NO, ONOOH and many others. This increase the oxidative stress on cells, which may explain the selective killing of cancer cells, which are already oxidatively stressed. Additionally, prokaryotic cells may be more sensitive to the oxidative stress than eukaryotic cells, allowing for selective killing of bacteria.

It is known that electric fields can influence cell membranes from studies on electroporation. Electric fields on the cells being treated by a plasma jet can be high enough to produce electroporation, which may directly influence the cell behavior, or may simply allow more reactive species to enter the cell. Both physical and chemical properties of plasma are known to induce uptake of nanomaterials in cells. For example, the uptake of 20 nm gold nanoparticles can be stimulated in cancer cells using non-lethal doses of cold plasma. Uptake mechanisms involve both energy dependent endocytosis and energy independent transport across cell membranes. The primary route for accelerated endocytosis of nanoparticles after exposure to cold plasma is a clathrin-dependent membrane repair pathway caused by lipid peroxidation and cell membrane damage.

The role of the immune system in plasma medicine has recently become very convincing. It is possible that the reactive species introduced by a plasma recruit a systemic immune response.
