= Nonthermal plasma =

Non-equilibrium state of matter

A nonthermal plasma, cold plasma or non-equilibrium plasma is a plasma which is not in thermodynamic equilibrium, because the electron temperature is much hotter than the temperature of heavy species (ions and neutrals). As only electrons are thermalized, their Maxwell-Boltzmann velocity distribution is very different from the ion velocity distribution. When one of the velocities of a species does not follow a Maxwell-Boltzmann distribution, the plasma is said to be non-Maxwellian.

A kind of common nonthermal plasma is the mercury-vapor gas within a fluorescent lamp, where the "electron gas" reaches a temperature of 20,000 K (19,700 °C; 35,500 °F) while the rest of the gas, ions and neutral atoms, stays barely above room temperature, so the bulb can even be touched with hands while operating.

== Applications ==
=== Food industry ===
In the context of food processing, a nonthermal plasma (NTP) or cold plasma is specifically an antimicrobial treatment being investigated for application to fruits, vegetables and meat products with fragile surfaces. These foods are either not adequately sanitized or are otherwise unsuitable for treatment with chemicals, heat or other conventional food processing tools. While the applications of nonthermal plasma were initially focused on microbiological disinfection, such as reduction of odors in pork production, newer applications such as enzyme inactivation, biomolecule oxidation, protein modification, prodrug activation, and pesticide dissipation are being actively researched. Nonthermal plasma also sees increasing use in the sterilization of teeth and hands, in hand dryers as well as in self-decontaminating filters. Non thermal plasmas are also used to treat seeds in order to improve germination rate and yield for controlled environment agriculture.

The term cold plasma has been recently used as a convenient descriptor to distinguish the one-atmosphere, near room temperature plasma discharges from other plasmas, operating at hundreds or thousands of degrees above ambient (see Plasma (physics) § Temperature. Within the context of food processing the term "cold" can potentially engender misleading images of refrigeration requirements as a part of the plasma treatment. However, in practice this confusion has not been an issue. "Cold plasmas" may also loosely refer to weakly ionized gases (degree of ionization < 0.01%).

==== Nomenclature ====
The nomenclature for nonthermal plasma found in the scientific literature is varied. In some cases, the plasma is referred to by the specific technology used to generate it ("gliding arc", "plasma pencil", "plasma needle", "plasma jet", "dielectric barrier discharge", "piezoelectric direct discharge plasma", etc.), while other names are more generally descriptive, based on the characteristics of the plasma generated ("one atmosphere uniform glow discharge plasma", "atmospheric plasma", "ambient pressure nonthermal discharges", "non-equilibrium atmospheric pressure plasmas", etc.). The two features which distinguish NTP from other mature, industrially applied plasma technologies, is that they are 1) nonthermal and 2) operate at or near atmospheric pressure.

==== Technologies ====
	NTP technology class		
	I. Remote treatment	II. Direct treatment	III. Electrode contact
Nature of NTP applied	Decaying plasma (afterglow) - longer lived chemical species	Active plasma - short and long-lived species	Active plasma - all chemical species, including shortest lived and ion bombardment
NTP density and energy	Moderate density - target remote from electrodes. However, a larger volume of NTP can be generated using multiple electrodes	Higher density - target in the direct path of a flow of active NTP	Highest density - target within NTP generation field
Spacing of target from NTP-generating electrode	Approx. 5–20 cm; arcing (filamentous discharge) unlikely to contact target at any power setting	Approx. 1–5 cm; arcing can occur at higher power settings, can contact target	Approx. ≤ 1 cm; arcing can occur between electrodes and target at higher power settings
Electrical conduction through target	No	Not under normal operation, but possible during arcing	Yes, if target is used as an electrode OR if target between mounted electrodes is electrically conductive
Suitability for irregular surfaces	High - remote nature of NTP generation means maximum flexibility of application of NTP afterglow stream	Moderately high - NTP is conveyed to target in a directional manner, requiring either rotation of target or multiple NTP emitters	Moderately low - close spacing is required to maintain NTP uniformity. However, electrodes can be shaped to fit a defined, consistent surface.
Examples of technologies	Remote exposure reactor, plasma pencil	Gliding arc; plasma needle; microwave-induced plasma tube	Parallel plate reactor; needle-plate reactor; resistive barrier discharge; dielectric barrier discharge
References			

=== Medicine ===
An emerging field adds the capabilities of nonthermal plasma to dentistry and medicine. Cold plasma is used to treat chronic wounds.

=== Power generation ===
Magnetohydrodynamic power generation, a direct energy conversion method from a hot gas in motion within a magnetic field was developed in the 1960s and 1970s with pulsed MHD generators known as shock tubes, using non-equilibrium plasmas seeded with alkali metal vapors (like caesium, to increase the limited electrical conductivity of gases) heated at a limited temperature of 2000 to 4000 kelvins (to protect walls from thermal erosion) but where electrons were heated at more than 10,000 kelvins.

A particular and unusual case of "inverse" nonthermal plasma is the very high temperature plasma produced by the Z machine, where ions are much hotter than electrons.

=== Aerospace ===
Aerodynamic active flow control solutions involving technological nonthermal weakly ionized plasmas for subsonic, supersonic and hypersonic flight are being studied, as plasma actuators in the field of electrohydrodynamics, and as magnetohydrodynamic converters when magnetic fields are also involved.

Studies conducted in wind tunnels involve most of the time low atmospheric pressure similar to an altitude of 20–50 km, typical of hypersonic flight, where the electrical conductivity of air is higher, hence non-thermal weakly ionized plasmas can be easily produced with a lower energy expense.

=== Catalysis ===
Atmospheric pressure non-thermal plasma can be used to promote chemical reactions. Collisions between hot temperature electrons and cold gas molecules can lead to dissociation reactions and the subsequent formation of radicals. This kind of discharge exhibits reacting properties that are usually seen in high temperature discharge systems. Non-thermal plasma is also used in conjunction with a catalyst to further enhance the chemical conversion of reactants or to alter the products chemical composition.

Among the different application fields, there are ozone production at a commercial level; pollution abatement, both solid (PM, VOC) and gaseous (SOx, NOx); CO_{2} conversion in fuels (methanol, syngas) or value added chemicals; nitrogen fixation; methanol synthesis; liquid fuels synthesis from lighter hydrocarbons (e.g. methane), hydrogen production via hydrocarbons reforming

==== Configurations ====
The coupling between the two different mechanisms can be done in two different ways: two-stage configuration, also called post-plasma catalysis (PPC) and one-stage configuration, also called in-plasma catalysis (IPC) or plasma enhanced catalysis (PEC).

In the first case the catalytic reactor is placed after the plasma chamber. This means that only the long-lived species can reach the catalyst surface and react, while short-lived radicals, ions and excited species decay in the first part of the reactor. As an example, the oxygen ground state atom O(3P) has a lifetime of about 14 μs in a dry air atmospheric pressure plasma. This means that only a small region of the catalyst is in contact with active radicals. In a such two-stage set-up, the main role of the plasma is to alter the gas composition fed to the catalytic reactor. In a PEC system, synergistic effects are greater since short-lived excited species are formed near the catalyst surface. The way the catalyst is inserted in the PEC reactor influence the overall performance. It can be placed inside the reactor in different ways: in powder form (packed bed), deposited on foams, deposited on structured material (honeycomb), and coating of the reactor walls

Packed bed plasma-catalytic reactor are commonly used for fundamental studies and a scale-up to industrial applications is difficult since the pressure drop increase with the flow rate.

==== Plasma-catalysis interactions ====
In a PEC system, the way the catalyst is positioned in relation to the plasma can affect the process in different ways. The catalyst can positively influence the plasma and vice versa resulting in an output that cannot be obtained using each process individually. The synergy that is established is ascribed to different cross effects.

- Plasma effects on catalyst:
  - Change in the physiochemical properties. Plasma change the adsorption/desorption equilibrium on the catalyst surface leading to higher adsorption capabilities. An interpretation to this phenomenon is not yet clear.
  - Higher catalyst surface area. A catalyst exposed to a discharge can give rise to the formation of nanoparticles. The higher surface/volume ratio leads to better catalyst performances.
  - Higher adsorption probability.
  - Change in the catalyst oxidation state. Some metallic catalyst (e.g. Ni, Fe) are more active in their metallic form. The presence of a plasma discharge can induce a reduction of the catalyst metal oxides, improving the catalytic activity.
  - Reduced coke formation. When dealing with hydrocarbons, coke formation leads to a progressive deactivation of the catalyst. The reduced coke formation in presence of plasma reduces the poisoning/deactivation rate and thus extending the life of a catalyst.
  - Presence of new gas phase species. In a plasma discharge a wide range of new species is produced allowing the catalyst to be exposed to them. Ions, vibrationally and rotationally excited species do not affect the catalyst since they lose charge and the additional energy they possess when they reach a solid surface. Radicals, instead, show high sticking coefficients for chemisorption, increasing the catalytic activity.
- Catalyst effects on plasma:
  - Local electric field enhancement. This aspect is mainly related to a packed-bed PEC configuration. The presence of a packing material inside an electric field generates local field enhancements due to the presence of asperities, solid material surface inhomogeneities, presence of pores and other physical aspects. This phenomenon is related to surface charge accumulation on the packing material surface and it is present even if a packed-bed is used without a catalyst. Despite this is a physical aspect, it also affects the chemistry since it alters the electron energy distribution in proximity of the asperities.
  - Discharges formation inside pores. This aspect is strictly related to the previous one. Small void spaces inside a packing material affect the electric field strength. The enhancement can also lead to a change in the discharge characteristics, which can be different from the discharge condition of the bulk region (i.e. far from the solid material). The high intensity of the electric field can also lead to the production of different species that are not observed in the bulk.
  - Change in the discharge type. Inserting a dielectric material in a discharge region leads to a shifting in the discharge type. From a filamentary regime a mixed filamentary/surface discharge is established. Ions, excited species and radicals are formed in a wider region if a surface discharge regime is present.

Catalyst effects on plasma are mostly related to the presence of a dielectric material inside the discharge region and do not necessarily require the presence of a catalyst.

== See also ==
- Anisothermal plasma
- Gliding Arc Plasmatron
