= Plasma Surgical =

American medical device company

- Company type: Private
- Industry: Medical devices
- Founded: 2000; 26 years ago
- Founder: Nikolay Suslov, Peter Gibson
- Headquarters: Roswell, Georgia, United States
- Products: PlasmaJet system
- Website: www.plasmasurgical.com

Plasma Surgical is a privately held medical device company with headquarters in suburban Atlanta, Georgia, USA, with operations in the UK and France. The company was founded based on the work of plasma physics professor Nikolay Suslov, who developed a technology to apply plasma energy to surgically treat live tissue with minimal thermal damage.

== Plasmas in surgery ==
Cold plasmas are extensively used in industry for critical surface cleaning and have been proposed for multiple applications in Plasma medicine, including sterilization or decontamination processes. Thermal plasmas are characterized as being macroscopically hot and have widespread industrial use in materials cutting, and more recently broad use in surgical procedures.

The origins of a thermal plasma with the ability to both cut and coagulate tissue lie in the early studies by the late John Glover and his colleagues at the Indiana University in the mid 1970s. Glover and his team described the first plasma scalpel and compared this to the use of the steel scalpel and electrosurgery. Although effective as a surgical tool, this relatively simple two electrode handpiece device involved a relatively high gas flow and in early pre-clinical and clinical use there was evidence of argon gas in the circulation with the concomitant risk of gas embolism. No subsequent development ensued and no commercially available system arose from this early work.

In the mid 1990s, Nikolay Suslov invented a multielectrode system that generated plasma with a higher power density using a very low level of current. This design used a low level DC current to generate a spectrally pure plasma flow in a small electrode group that facilitated the design of small diameter handpieces capable of generating a high power density of plasma flow using a very low argon flow of typically 0.2 - 0.6 L/min. This approach was developed further in 1999–2008 to create the company's flagship product.

== Products ==
The company's core product is the PlasmaJet system which utilizes an inert gas that is electrically excited to a plasma state, releasing three forms of energy: Light, Kinetic and Thermal. It is used for open and laparoscopic surgical procedures and the cutting, coagulation and removal of soft tissue by vaporization in gynecology, oncology, general surgery, and other areas. and ovarian cysts, and for tumor debulking. The system was selected as the 2008 Innovation of the Year by the Society of Laparoendoscopic Surgeons.

The PlasmaJet is currently cleared and available for use in the United States as a neutral plasma surgery system designed for cutting, coagulation and the removal of soft tissue by vaporization in open surgery and laparoscopic surgery. The system also carries a CE mark and is approved and available for use in the European Union as a cutting and coagulation device in open and laparoscopic surgery.

== History ==
In 1994, Professor Nikolay Suslov of Russia described a low voltage DC-excited multiple-electrode plasma surgery handpiece with low gas flow, signalling the possibility for effective clinical applications. Suslov's first US patent for plasma surgery device was published in 1998. Following his findings and patent publication, Suslov and fellow professor Peter Gibson co-founded Plasma Surgical Limited in 2000. The company was headquartered in London, UK and had operations in Gothenburg, Sweden. The company introduced a prototype Neutral Plasma Coagulator at the American College of Surgeons Congress in 2002.

In 2010 the company moved its headquarters from Europe to the US, establishing R&D, manufacturing and commercialization function in Roswell, Georgia, 20 miles north of Atlanta.

In 2011, the company began broader commercialization efforts for the PlasmaJet in the US, Europe and Russia, with a total installed base of approximately 100 systems in hospitals and clinics.

In 2012 the company received FDA clearance for an expanded indication for use, adding the removal of soft tissue by vaporization.
