= Plasma-activated water =

Water that has been treated using cold atmospheric plasma

Plasma-activated water (PAW) is water that has been treated using cold atmospheric plasma (CAP).

Possible uses for PAW include in medical treatments such as wound healing and cancer treatment, along with agriculture processes, from seed germination to crop protection. Additionally, PAW has the potential to replace the use of more toxic chemicals for the elimination of spoilage bacteria in foodstuffs. Other uses have been explored in materials processing, materials synthesis, and analytical chemistry.

== Properties ==
PAW contains reactive oxygen and nitrogen species, with a pH lower than untreated water along with higher electrical conductivity.

PAW has disinfective properties: the oxidative stress that it causes on the cell membranes of the bacterial cells results in disruption of the cell membrane, followed by further damage that leads to cell death.

== Generation ==
PAW is produced through the generation of plasma inside the water to generate the required ions.

The interaction between cold atmospheric plasma (CAP) and water modifies the liquid chemical properties through the production of reactive oxygen and nitrogen species (RONS). RONS thus generated fall into two macro groups: long-lived species such as hydrogen peroxide (H_{2}O_{2}), nitrites (NO_{2}^{−}), nitrates (NO_{3}^{−}), ozone (O_{3}), and short-lived species such as hydroxyl radicals (OH^{·}), nitric oxide (NO), superoxide (O_{2}^{−}), and peroxynitrous acid (ONOOH).

== Applications ==
PAW's strong antimicrobial properties suggest a possible use in food sanitation, especially as an alternative to more toxic substances.
