= Nyheim Plasma Institute =

Research facility in the United States

C. & J. Nyheim Plasma Institute
- Established: 2002
- Field of research: Plasma technology
- Director: Alexander Fridman, Ph.D.
- Faculty: 25
- Students: 35
- Location: Camden, New Jersey, U.S.
- Website: drexel.edu/nyheiminstitute/

The C. & J. Nyheim Plasma Institute, located in Camden, New Jersey, is a university-based plasma research facility. Founded in 2002 as the A. J. Drexel Plasma institute, the institute is led by Drexel University. The primary fields of research are applications in medicine, energy, and agricultural industries. The institute researches types of plasma discharges such as gliding arc, dielectric barrier discharge, gliding arc tornado, reverse vortex flow, and pulsed corona discharge.
