= Barry J. Byrne =

American physician-scientist

- Education: Denison University; University of Illinois Chicago; Johns Hopkins University
- Awards: Fellow of the American Academy of Pediatrics and The American College of Cardiology
- Scientific career
- Fields: gene therapy genetic diseases, genetics and pediatric cardiology
- Workplaces: University of Florida

Barry J. Byrne (born 1956) is an American clinician-scientist who is an academic researcher specializing in neuromuscular and genetic diseases, genetics and pediatric cardiology.

He is the Director of the Powell Gene Therapy Center at the University of Florida and Associate Chair of Pediatrics. He also holds the Earl and Christy Powell University Chair in Genetics.

He is known for his work in developing gene therapy approaches for inherited muscle disorders, including Duchenne muscular dystrophy, limb girdle muscular dystrophy, Pompe disease, Friedreich's ataxia and Barth syndrome. He serves as Chief Medical Advisor to the Muscular Dystrophy Association (MDA) and was appointed to its Board of Directors in 2024.

He is a Fellow of the American Academy of Pediatrics and the American College of Cardiology.

== Education ==
Byrne attended Lake Forest High School. He earned a Bachelor of Science degree in chemistry from Denison University. He subsequently pursued both an M.D. and a Ph.D. in microbiology and immunology at the University of Illinois Chicago. Following medical school, he completed pediatric residency training, a fellowship in pediatric cardiology, and postdoctoral training in biological chemistry at Johns Hopkins University, where he later joined the faculty. As a resident and fellow at Johns Hopkins Hospital, he was introduced to clinical research and established the basis for the current practice of newborn screening for critical congenital heart disease. During his early faculty years at Johns Hopkins, he discovered the ability of adeno-associated virus (AAV) vectors to produce therapeutic proteins when delivered to the heart and skeletal muscle leading to the current field of neuromuscular and cardiac gene therapy.

== Career ==
=== Academic career ===
Byrne joined the faculty of the University of Florida in 1997. He has since held multiple roles in clinical care, research, and education within the College of Medicine. As director of the Powell Gene Therapy Center, he oversees programs devoted to the study and application of adeno-associated virus (AAV) technology for treating genetic disorders. He is also the Earl and Christy Powell University Chair in Genetics. At University of Florida, he leads initiatives to expand cell and gene therapy programs, including the UF Health Center for Advanced Therapeutics, supported in part by strategic funding from the university. He also participates in projects integrating digital health into clinical care.

At University of Florida, he leads initiatives to expand cell and gene therapy programs, including the UF Health Center for Advanced Therapeutics, supported

In September 2024, Byrne was appointed to the Board of Directors of the Muscular Dystrophy Association, in addition to his role as the organization's Chief Medical Advisor.

Byrne has been an active member of the American Society of Gene and Cell Therapy (ASGCT) since its founding in 1996. In 2025, he was elected president-elect of ASGCT and will serve as president in 2027, coinciding with the society's 30th anniversary.

=== Professional career ===
In addition to his academic work, Byrne has been active in biotechnology innovation. He is a founder of several Florida-based biotech companies, including Applied Genetic Technologies Corporation (AGTC), Lacerta Therapeutics, AavantiBio, and Ventura Life Sciences.

=== Patient Advocacy ===
Byrne has been a strong patient advocate for organizations working to raise awareness and support research in rare disease areas. In support to CureDuchenne, he has participated in awareness and fund raising efforts as part of Climb to CureDuchenne with expeditions to Mt. Ranier, Grand Teton and Mt. Kilimonjaro. He and the team at University of Florida have been part of the Friedreich’s Ataxia Research Alliance Ride Ataxia and he has endured the Duchenne Dash from London to Paris to raise funds for Duchenne UK.

== Research ==
His work has been central to the translation of basic AAV research into clinical applications. At the University of Florida, Byrne has been involved in more than 60 invention disclosures and numerous patents related to AAV technology.

Byrne became involved in rare disease research after clinical encounters with infant patients affected by Pompe disease. His laboratory has played a role in developing adeno-associated virus (AAV)-based gene therapies to deliver DNA to skeletal and cardiac muscle, pioneering therapeutic strategies for inherited muscle diseases.

Byrne's clinical and research interests encompass Duchenne muscular dystrophy, Friedreich's ataxia, spinal muscular atrophy, Barth syndrome, Pompe disease and related neuromuscular disorders. His ongoing work centers on refining gene therapy delivery systems, evaluating long-term durability of treatment, and optimizing strategies to improve skeletal and cardiac muscle regeneration.

Byrne's work on Pompe disease was among the scientific efforts depicted in the 2010 feature film Extraordinary Measures, inspired by the experiences of John Crowley and his family. The film portrays Crowley's efforts to secure experimental treatment for his children and includes a composite scientist character, Robert Stonehill, played by Harrison Ford, who was partly based on Byrne and other researchers involved in Pompe disease studies.

== Awards ==
His awards include the Johns Hopkins University Clinician Scientist Award (1994), the University of Florida Clinician Scientist Award (1996), the University of Florida Research Professor Award (2003–2006), the University of Florida Faculty Research Prize in Clinical Research (2007), and the University of Florida Research Foundation (UFRF) Professorship (2017–2020).

Byrne was inducted into the Florida Inventors Hall of Fame in 2024 for his contributions to the development of muscle gene therapy and holds more than 25 U.S. patents. He has received the See the Light Award from the Mathew Forbes Romer Foundation In 2025 he was inducted into the Academy of Science, Engineering and Medicine of Florida (ASEMFL).
