= Anisothermal plasma =

An Anisothermal plasma is a plasma which thermal state can be approximated by more than one temperature for the different degrees of freedom of the plasma. The degrees of freedom refer to translation (kinetic energy), rotation, vibration of each particle type.

Examples of anisothermal plasmas can be found among low-pressure plasmas that are excited by high frequency electric fields, see frequency classification of plasmas. They generally exhibit hot electrons that are powered by the alternating electric field, and a neutral and ion component, which is significantly colder due to the low efficiency of the energy transfer between light electrons and heavy neutrals and ions.

There has been recent research to improve the formula for the "equation of partial equilibrium" of such plasmas.

The term nonthermal plasma includes anisothermal plasmas and means that the different degrees of freedom of the plasma are not in thermal equilibrium.
