= Wingless Electromagnetic Air Vehicle =

Type of flight system

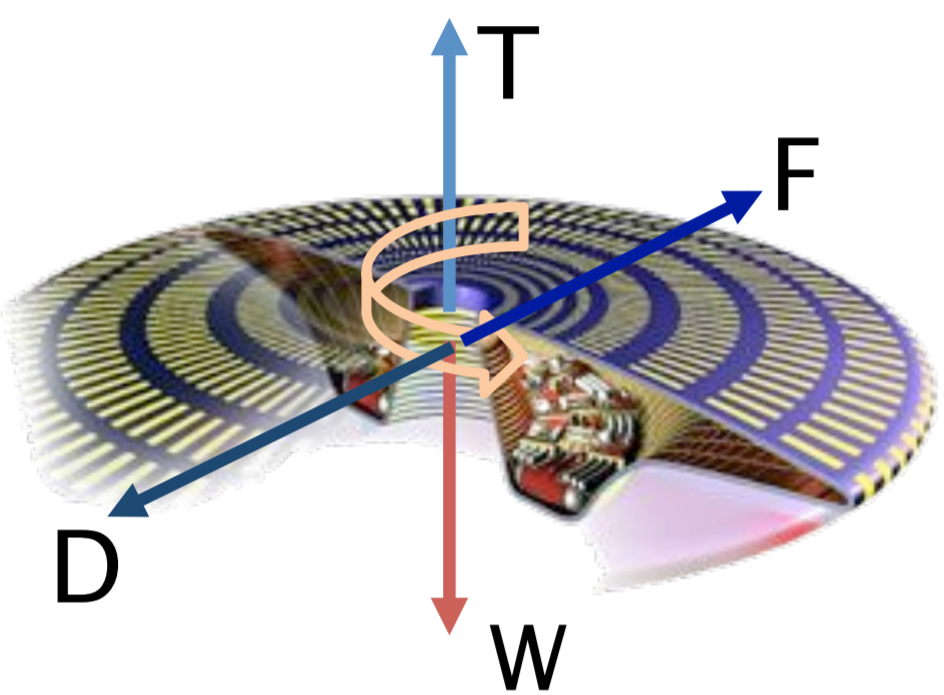
The Wingless Electromagnetic Air Vehicle (WEAV) is a heavier-than-air flight system which can self-lift, hover, and fly reliably with no moving components.

The Wingless Electromagnetic Air Vehicle (WEAV) is a heavier than air flight system developed at the University of Florida, funded by the Air Force Office of Scientific Research. The WEAV was invented in 2006 by Dr. Subrata Roy, plasma physicist, aerospace engineering professor at the University of Florida, and has been a subject of several patents. The WEAV employs no moving parts, and combines the aircraft structure, propulsion, energy production and storage, and control subsystems into one integrated system.

== Operating mechanism ==
The WEAV uses a multitude of small electrodes covering the whole wetted area of the aircraft, in a multi-barrier plasma actuator (MBPA) arrangement, an enhancement over dual-electrode dielectric barrier discharge (DBD) systems using multiple layers of dielectric materials and powered electrodes. These electrodes are very close to one another so surrounding air can be ionized using RF AC high voltage of a few tens of kilovolts even at the standard pressure of one atmosphere. The resultant plasma contains ions that are accelerated by the Coulomb force using electrohydrodynamics (EHD) at low altitude and small velocity. The surface of the vehicle acts as an electrostatic fluid accelerator pumping surrounding air as ion wind, radially then downward, so the lower pressure zone on the upper surface and the higher pressure zone underneath the aircraft produces lift and thrust for propulsion and stability. At a higher altitude and to reach greater speeds, a magnetic field is also applied to enhance collisions between electrons and heavy species in the plasma and use the more powerful Lorentz body force to accelerate all charge carriers in the same direction along a radial high speed jet.

== Novel technologies ==
To achieve its mission, the WEAV-related research introduced a number of plasma actuator designs. This section highlights the main technologies.

=== Multi-barrier plasma actuators ===
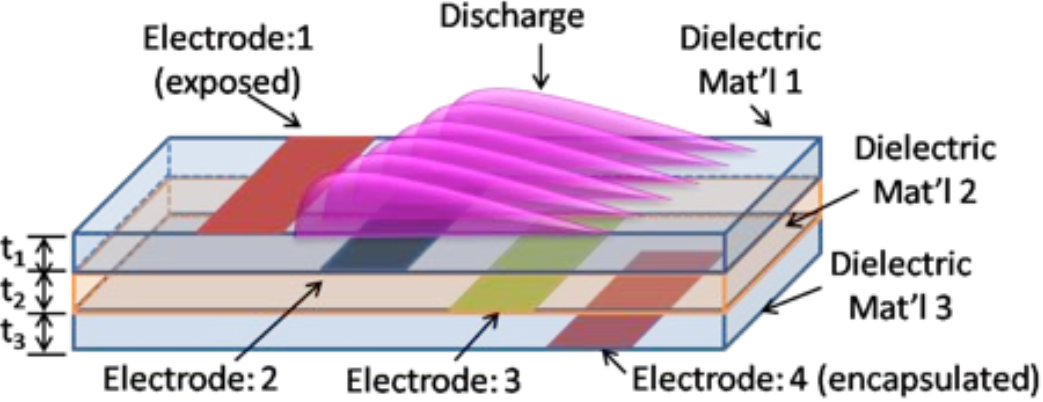
Schematic of a tri-layer multi-barrier plasma actuator (MBPA) design. Though a tri-layer MBPA design is shown, other configurations are possible.

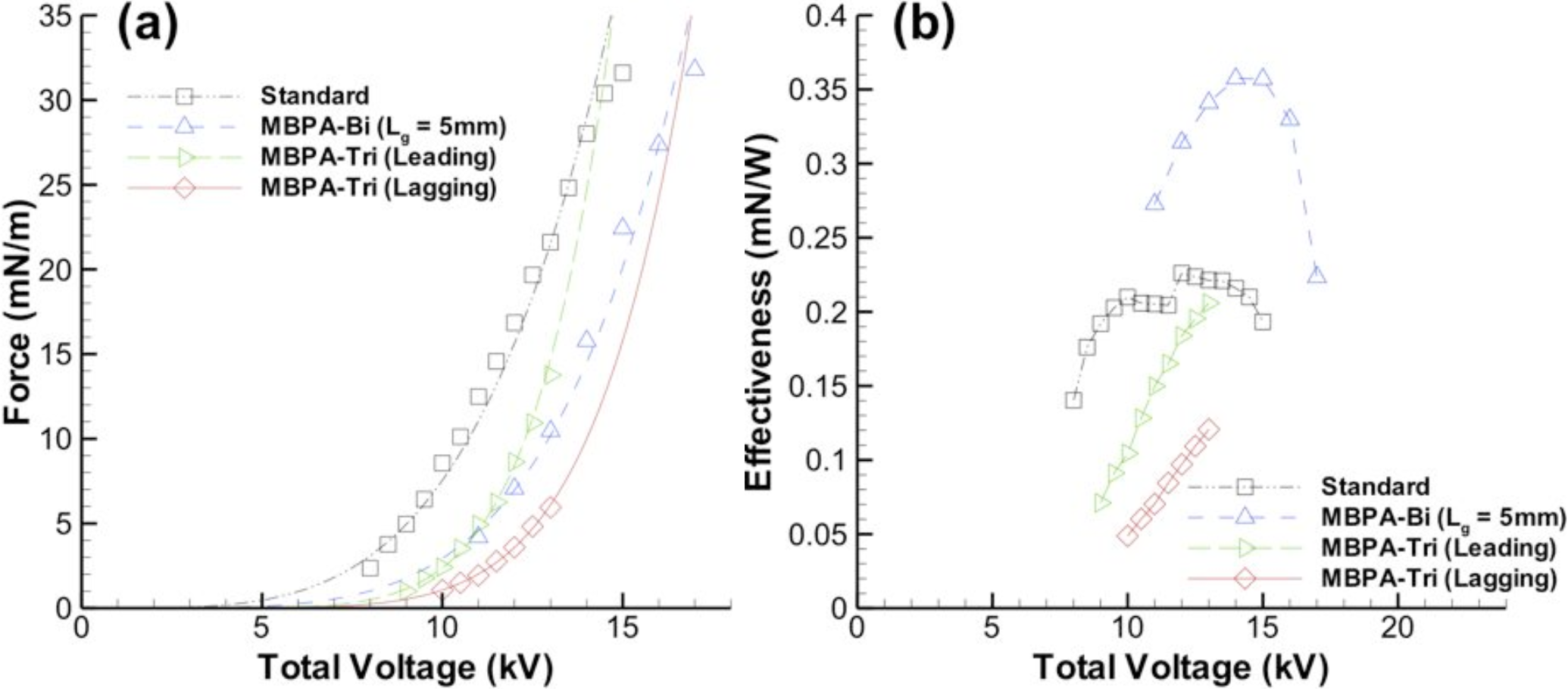
Comparison of force and effectiveness among various single, bi-layer, and tri-layer MBPA designs

The conventional single dielectric barrier discharge (DBD) actuator design is composed of two electrodes separated by a single dielectric material. Much work has gone into optimizing the design and performance of the single DBD design, however research work continues to improve the performance of these actuators. The MBPA design is an extension of the single DBD actuator design which introduces additional dielectric barriers and electrodes, and thus additional design parameters. Research indicates that MBPA designs may achieve higher resultant thrust and improved thrust-to-power ratios than the single DBD actuator design. Sample trials of a bi-layer MBPA design demonstrated an approximately 40% increase in effectiveness over the conventional single layer design.

=== Serpentine actuators ===
The WEAV employed serpentine geometry plasma actuators for fully three-dimensional flow control which combine the effects of a linear actuator and plasma synthetic jet. Due to the periodic geometry of the serpentine design, there is pinching and spreading of the surrounding air along the actuator.

=== Micro-scale actuators ===
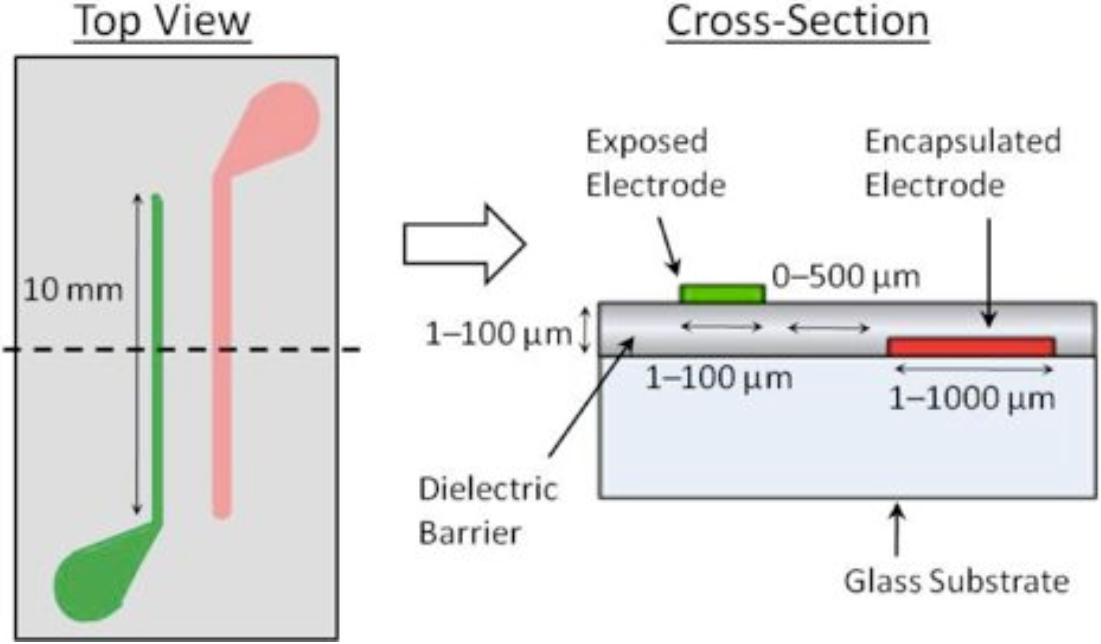
Top and cross-sectional schematic of microscale dielectric barrier discharge plasma actuator

Experimental results and numerical simulation demonstrate that by shrinking the gap between electrodes to micron size, the electric force density in the discharge region is increased by at least an order of magnitude and the power required for plasma discharge is decreased by an order of magnitude. Consequently, physically smaller and lighter power supplies can be used with these so-called micro-scale actuators. Investigations demonstrated that per actuator, induced velocities from the micro-scale plasma actuator are comparable to their standard, macro-scale counterparts, albeit with an order of magnitude less thrust. However, due to the decreased power requirements of the micro-scale plasma actuators, experiments suggest effective macroscopic flow control via large arrays of micro-scale plasma actuators.

=== Novel materials ===
In addition to experimental plasma actuator designs and geometries, the WEAV investigated the performance of a large variety of insulating materials for use in the dielectric barrier layer, including flexible materials such as silicone rubber and ferroelectric modified lead zirconate-titanate (PZT) and silica aerogel.

Successful dielectric materials investigated
Material	Thickness (μm)
Acrylic	500, 1000, 3000
Cirlex	254, 2540
PDMS (Polydimethylsiloxane)	~1000
Silicone rubber (high-purity)	127
Torlon	250
PZT	3000
Silica Aerogel	6000

== See also ==
- Plasma actuator
- Ionocraft
- Lightcraft
- Magnetohydrodynamic drive
