= Atmospheric-pressure plasma =

Plasma in which the pressure equals that of the surrounding atmosphere

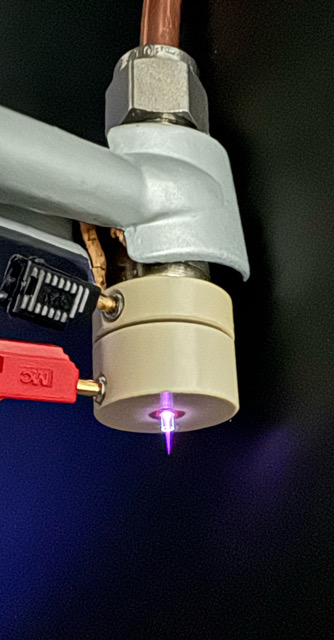
An atmospheric-pressure plasma jet formed by helium flowing through a concentric dielectric barrier discharge (DBD)

Atmospheric-pressure plasma (or AP plasma or normal pressure plasma) is a plasma in which the pressure approximately matches that of the surrounding atmosphere – the so-called normal pressure.

== Fundamentals of atmospheric-pressure plasma generation ==
A discharge can be ignited and plasma can be sustained when a DC voltage that is delivered to the gas medium via electrodes is higher than the breakdown voltage for the gas. The relationship between this breakdown voltage and the product of p and d - where p is the gas pressure and d is the distance between the electrodes—is referred to as Paschen's law. For a range of gas molecules, the breakdown voltage estimated by Paschen's law has a minimum value of around pd = 1-10 Torr cm. This suggests that in order to get a practical breakdown voltage for the gas discharge to ignite, a smaller electrode-gap distance is preferred as gas pressure increases. The Paschen-minimum condition at atmospheric pressure can be reached at a gap spacing of considerably less than a millimeter, at which point a few hundreds of volt should be the DC voltage needed for the gas breakdown. However, the breakdown DC voltage for argon gas at atmospheric pressure is predicted to rise to a few kV at a gap spacing of 5 mm.

Reducing the breakdown voltage is advantageous from a plasma source design perspective since it allows for handling flexibility and easier source operation. The use of higher-frequency HF voltage sources is one approach to reducing the breakdown voltage.

As the pressure increases, the transfer of energy from electrons to gas molecules and ions through collisions becomes more efficient, resulting in the establishment of thermal equilibrium among electrons, gas molecules, and ions. However, it is possible to inhibit the energy transfer between the electrons and the gas molecules and ions. Dielectric barrier discharge (DBD) is one of the main ways to produce low-temperature plasmas in a non-equilibrium condition at atmospheric pressure.

Additionally, there have been reports stating that the Atmospheric-pressure glow discharge, when powered by a low-frequency (10-100 kHz) source, needs a dielectric barrier on one side of the electrodes to ensure stable and consistent operation. However, when the operating frequency is increased to RF, reaching frequencies as high as 13.56 MHz, the stability of the plasma greatly improves, making the dielectric barrier no longer necessary for stable operation.

== Technical significance ==
Atmospheric-pressure plasmas matter because in contrast with low-pressure plasma or high-pressure plasma, no reaction vessel is needed to maintain pressure. Depending on the generation principle, these plasmas can be employed directly in the production line. This eliminates the need for cost-intensive chambers for producing a partial vacuum as used in low-pressure plasma technology.

== Generation ==
Although the disadvantages of low-pressure plasmas can be avoided by plasma formation at atmospheric pressure, maintaining atmospheric pressure plasmas necessitates high voltage for gas breakdown and causes greater collisions between electrons and gas molecules, which can lead to arcing and gas heating.

Various forms of excitation are distinguished:

- DC (direct current) and low-frequency excitation
- RF (radio frequency) excitation
- Microwave excitation

Atmospheric-pressure plasmas that have attained any noteworthy industrial significance are those generated by DC excitation (electric arc), AC excitation (corona discharge, dielectric barrier discharge, piezoelectric direct discharge and plasma jets as well as 2.45 GHz microwave microplasma).

=== DC plasma jet ===
By means of a high-voltage discharge (5–15 kV, 10–100 kHz) a pulsed electric arc is generated. A process gas, usually oil-free compressed air flowing past this discharge section, is excited and converted to the plasma state. This plasma passes through a jet head to the surface of the material to be treated. The jet head determines the geometry of the beam and is at earth potential to hold back potential-carrying parts of the plasma stream.

=== Microwave plasma jet ===
A microwave system uses amplifiers that output up to 200 watts of power radio frequency (RF) power to produce the arc that generates plasma. Most solutions work at 2.45 GHz. A new technology provides ignition and highly efficient operation with the same electronic and couple network. This kind of atmospheric-pressure plasmas is different. The plasma is only top of the electrode. That is the reason the construction of a cannula jet was possible.

== Applications ==
Manufacturers use plasma jets for, among other things, activating and cleaning plastic and metal surfaces to prepare them for adhesive bonding and painting. Sheet materials up to several meters wide can be treated today by aligning a number of jets in a row. Surface modification achieved by plasma jets is comparable to the effects obtained with low-pressure plasma.

Depending on the power of the jet, the plasma beam can be up to 40 mm long and attain a treatment width of 15 mm. Special rotary systems allow a treatment width per jet tool of up to 13 cm. Depending on the required treatment performance, the plasma source is moved at a spacing of 10–40 mm and at a speed of 5–400 m/min relative to the surface of the material being treated.

A key advantage of this system is that it can be integrated in-line in existing production systems. In addition, the activation achievable is distinctly higher than in potential-based pretreatment methods (corona discharge).

It is possible to coat varied surfaces with this technique. Anticorrosive layers and adhesion promoter layers can be applied to many metals without solvents, providing a much more environmentally friendly solution.

== See also ==
- Laser Schlieren Deflectometry
- Dielectric barrier discharge
- Plasma pencil
