= Piezoelectric direct discharge plasma =

Piezoelectric direct discharge (PDD) plasma is a type of cold non-equilibrium plasma, generated by a direct gas discharge of a high voltage piezoelectric transformer. It can be ignited in air or other gases in a wide range of pressures, including atmospheric. Due to the compactness and the efficiency of the piezoelectric transformer, this method of plasma generation is particularly compact, efficient and cheap. It enables a wide spectrum of industrial, medical and consumer applications.

== Background ==
Cold non-equilibrium atmospheric-pressure plasmas can be produced by high voltage discharges in the atmospheres of various working gases. The following 3 types of electric discharges found most applications in industrial processes:

- Electric arc discharges are self-sustaining DC discharges characterized by high electric currents, which are drawn from the cathode by intensive thermionic and field emission. Due to the intense currents, the volume of the arc reaches thermal equilibrium with temperatures of 6.000 – 12.000 C. While the arc discharge can be sustained in the DC mode, a pulsed operation is more stable against imperfections of a quickly eroding cathode surface.
- Corona discharges occur in the regions of high electric fields with high field gradients, present near sharp edges of high voltage electrodes. To prevent sparking, such electrodes should be far from the electric grounds. While corona discharges require rather high voltages, the emitted electric currents are low, resulting in a low discharge power. Although the DC operation is standard for the corona discharge, the AC operation increases its power.
- Dielectric barrier discharge occurs between two electrodes separated by a dielectric when the electrodes are biased by a sine-wave or pulsed high voltage. The discharge current is sourced from the surface of the dielectric. The power of the dielectric barrier discharge is significantly higher than that of the corona discharge, but smaller comparing to the arc discharge.

All these types of electric discharges require high voltage electronics and high voltage cabling. Those are bulky, expensive, and in the case of AC power can be very inefficient due to dielectric losses. Moreover, industrial applications often require high power of the order 1 kW. This imposes strict safety requirements on the high voltage enclosures with open electrodes. A construction based on multiple low-power high voltage modules might improve safety aspects. Likewise, incorporation of the high voltage generator and the discharge electrode into a single module should reduce dielectric losses in the cables. However, so far no cost-effective solution to the system based on low-power modules was found.

== Principles of PDD ==
Piezoelectric direct discharge uses a piezoelectric transformer as a generator of AC high voltage. The high voltage side of this transformer acts as an electrode generating electric discharges in the air or other working gases producing atmospheric-pressure plasmas. The piezoelectric transformer is very compact and requires only a source of a low power low voltage AC. This allows the whole plasma generator to be made exceptionally compact and cheap, enabling construction of hand-held plasma generators or cost-effective plasma generator arrays.

Piezoelectric transformers of the Rosen type, which can be made of lead zirconate titanate, convert the electric energy in the form of low voltage AC into mechanical oscillations. Consequently, these mechanical oscillations produce high voltage AC at the other end of the transformer. The highest amplitude is achieved at mechanical resonances, which occur at the frequencies typically between 10 kHz and 500 kHz. The dimensions of the piezoelectric crystal define the resonance frequency, while its dielectric environment can cause small shifts of the resonance. The low voltage electronics continuously adjusts the frequency to keep the transformer operating within the resonance. At the resonance, such transformers offer very high voltage conversion factors up to 1000 with voltages of 5 – 15 kV.

== Properties of the plasma ==
Electric discharges produced in the gas from the high voltage side of the piezoelectric transformer have properties found also in the corona discharges and in the dielectric barrier discharges. While the former mode occurs when the high voltage side of the piezoelectric transformer is operated far from the electric grounds, the latter mode occurs when it is operated close to the electric grounds separated by a dielectric. Near the open electric grounds, the piezoelectric transformer produces periodic sparks. Transition to the electric arc does not occur because of the limited power of the transformer. The typical power of such transformers is of the order of 10 W. The efficiency of the plasma generation reaches 90%, while the remaining 10% of the power is lost due to mechanical and dielectric heating of the piezoelectric transformer.

Due to low electric currents, typical for the dielectric barrier and the corona discharges, the piezoelectric direct discharge produces a non-equilibrium plasma. This means that its constituent electrons, ions and the neutral gas particles have different kinetic energy distributions. Temperature of the neutral gas within the plasma volume remains lower than 50 C. At the same time, the electrons and the ions reach energies of 1 – 10 eV. This is 300 – 3000 times higher than the average energy of the neutral gas particles. The densities of the electrons and the ions reach 10^{16} – 10^{14} m^{−3}. Since most of the plasma volume consists of the cold neutral gas, the plasma is cold. However, the very energetic electrons and ions excite atoms and molecules producing large amounts of short-lived chemical species, making this plasma chemically very active.

== Applications ==
Properties of the piezoelectric direct discharge plasmas enable a large spectrum of applications in medical technology, microbiology and clinical research. Typical industrial applications include ultra-fine cleaning and plasma activation of metal, ceramic, glass and plastic surfaces. Such plasma processing increases the surface energy improving the surface wettability and adhesion. The latter increases the quality of the subsequent printing or gluing.

Very compact dimensions of the PDD plasma generator further broaden the sphere of possible applications to compact devices for laboratory work, hand-held applications, ozone generators, and even consumer products.

== See also ==
- Corona treatment
