= Florida Inventors Hall of Fame =

- Abbreviation: FIHF
- Formation: 2013
- Type: NPO
- Legal status: Organization
- Location: Tampa, Florida
- Region served: United States
- Official language: English
- Website: https://www.floridainvents.org/

The Florida Inventors Hall of Fame is an organization that honors Florida inventors, and is housed in the USF Research Park at the University of South Florida (USF) in Tampa, Florida. It was founded in 2013 by Dr. Paul R. Sanberg, senior vice president for research and innovation at USF, and is one of five state-specific halls of fame dedicated to inventors in the United States. In April 2014, State Senator Jeff Brandes sponsored the recognition of it, honoring the hall of fame for its commitment to invention, discovery, innovation, and excellence.

== History ==
The FIHF was founded by Paul Sanberg, after visiting the National Inventors Hall of Fame, located in Alexandria, Virginia, and noticing a lack of Floridians in the Hall. The Florida Inventors Hall of Fame was formed in 2013 and the first induction ceremony was held September 10, 2014, in Tampa Florida. The first inductees included historic inventors Thomas Edison (who had a laboratory in Fort Myers, Florida), Robert Cade, John Gorrie, and William Glenn, as well as currently active scientists, Shin-Tson Wu, and Shyam Mohapatra. The second annual induction ceremony has been announced for October 2, 2015, in Tampa.

== Operations ==
The FIHF is led by an advisory board, chaired by Sanberg. The FIHF inducts new honorees annuallythrough a nomination and review process. Eligible inductees are any living or deceased person who has lived or worked in Florida, held at least one U.S. patent, and have demonstrably improved life quality for the state and people of Florida and the United States.

== Notable living inductees ==
Among the first inductees to the hall of fame were optics physicist Shin-Tson Wu, a University of Central Florida professor. Wu is most notable for improving liquid crystal displays which are used in the screens of appliances like computers, smart phones, and televisions.

Another living inductee was Shyam Mohapatra, a pioneer in the field of biomedical nanotechnology and a USF Health Distinguished Professor at the University of South Florida as well as research scientist at the James A. Haley VA Medical Center.
