= Plasma actuator =

Type of actuator

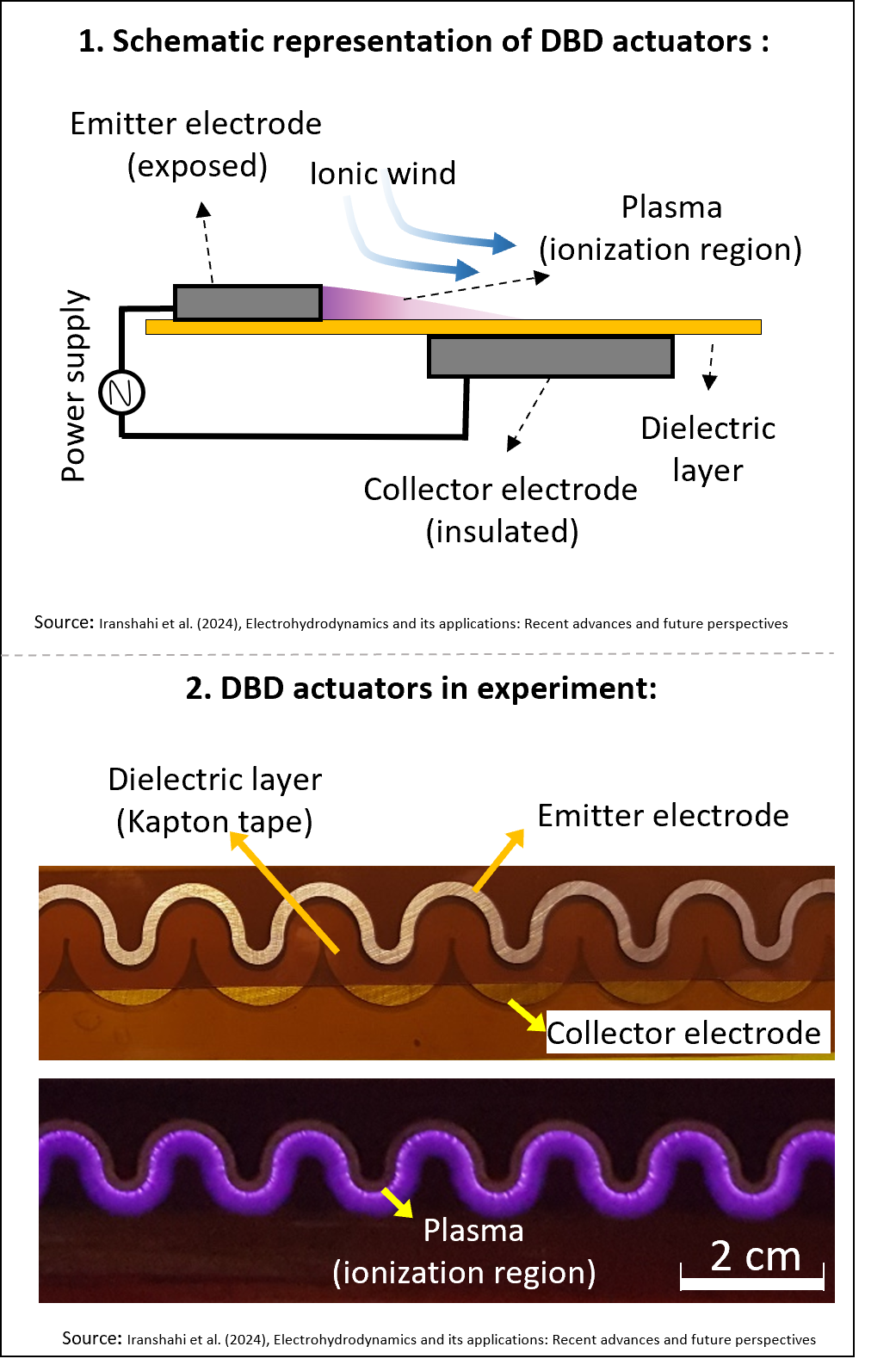
DBD plasma actuators employed for airflow control applications

Plasma actuators are a type of actuator currently being developed for active aerodynamic flow control. Plasma actuators impart force in a similar way to ionocraft. Plasma flow control has drawn considerable attention and been used in boundary layer acceleration, airfoil separation control, forebody separation control, turbine blade separation control, axial compressor stability extension, heat transfer and high-speed jet control.

Dielectric barrier discharge (DBD) plasma actuators are widely utilized in airflow control applications. DBD is a type of electrical discharge commonly used in various electrohydrodynamic (EHD) applications.

In DBDs, the emitter electrode is connected to a high-voltage source and exposed to the surrounding air, while the collector electrode is grounded and encapsulated within the dielectric material (see figure). When activated, they form a low-temperature plasma between the electrodes by application of a high-voltage AC signal across the electrodes. Consequently, air molecules from the air surrounding the emitter electrode are ionized, and are accelerated towards the counter electrode through the electric field.

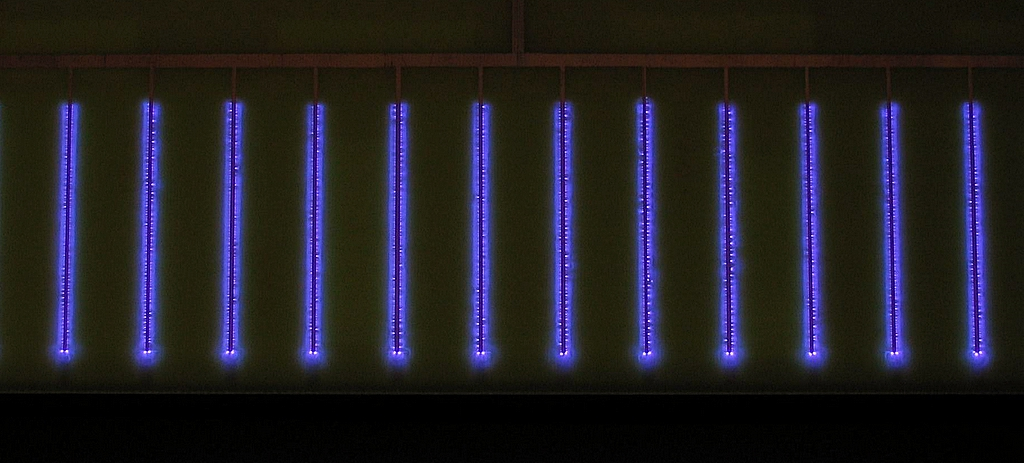
Glow of plasma actuator discharges

== Introduction ==
Plasma actuators operating at the atmospheric conditions are promising for flow control, mainly for their physical properties, such as the induced body force by a strong electric field and the generation of heat during an electric arc, and the simplicity of their constructions and placements. In particular, the recent invention of glow discharge plasma actuators by Roth (2003) that can produce sufficient quantities of glow discharge plasma in the atmosphere pressure air helps to yield an increase in flow control performance.

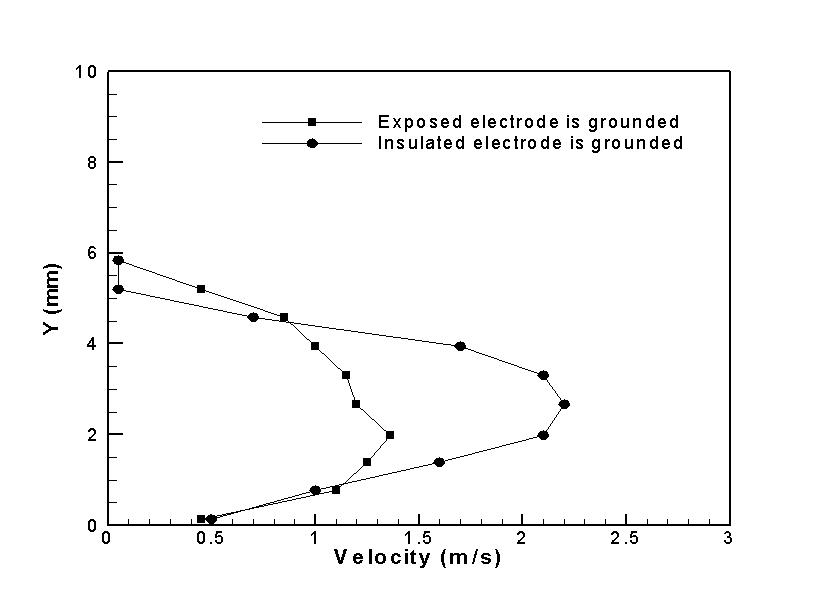
Local flow speed induced by a plasma actuator

== Power supply and electrode layouts ==
Either a direct current (DC), an alternating current (AC) power supply, or a microwave microdischarge can be used for different configurations of plasma actuators. One schematic of an AC power supply design for a dielectric barrier discharge plasma actuator is given here as an example. The performance of plasma actuators is determined by dielectric materials and power inputs, later is limited by the qualities of MOSFET or IGBT.

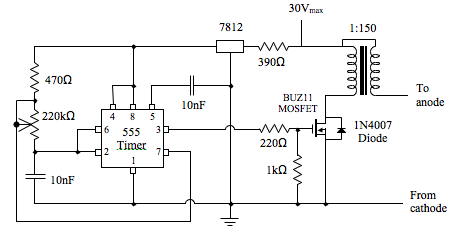
Driving circuits (E-type) of a power supply

The driving waveforms can be optimized to achieve a better actuation (induced flow speed). However, a sinusoidal waveform may be preferable for the simplicity in power supply construction. The additional benefit is the relatively less electromagnetic interference. Pulse-width modulation can be adopted to instantaneously adjust the strength of actuation.

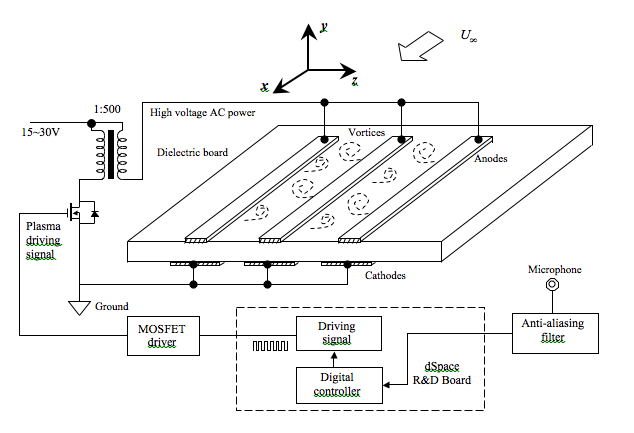
Pulse-width modulation of plasma power input

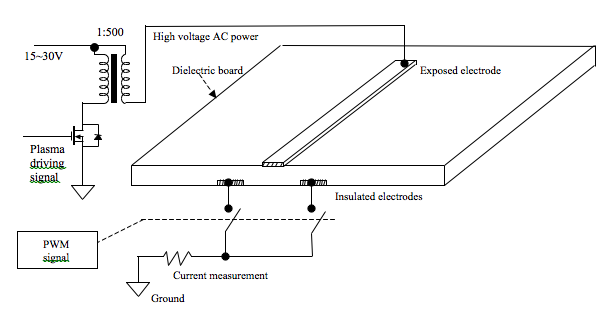
One configuration of DBD plasma actuator

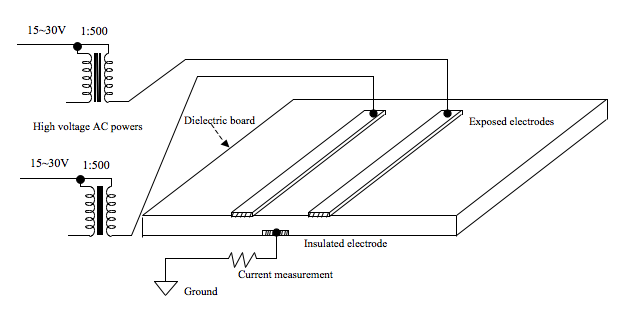
One configuration of DBD plasma actuator

Manipulation of the encapsulated electrode and distributing the encapsulated electrode throughout the dielectric layer has been shown to alter the performance of the dielectric barrier discharge (DBD) plasma actuator. Locating the initial encapsulated electrode closer to the dielectric surface results in induced velocities higher than the baseline case for a given voltage. In addition, Actuators with a shallow initial electrode are able to more efficiently impart momentum and mechanical power into the flow.

No matter how much funding has been invested and the number of various private claims of a high induced speed, the maximum, average speed induced by plasma actuators on an atmospheric pressure conviction, without any assistant of mechanical amplifier (chamber, cavity etc.), is still less than 10 m/s.

== Influence of temperature ==
The surface temperature plays an important role in limiting the usefulness of a dielectric barrier discharge plasma actuator. The thrust produced by an actuator in quiescent air increases with a power law of the applied voltage. For voltages greater than a threshold, the exponent of the power-law reduces limiting the thrust increase, and the actuator is said to have "saturated," limiting the actuator's performance. The onset of saturation can visually be correlated by the inception of filamentary discharge events. The saturation effect can be manipulated by changing the local surface temperature of the dielectric. Also, when dealing with real-life aircraft equipped with plasma actuators, it is important to consider the effect of temperature. The temperature variations encountered during a flight envelope may have adverse effects in actuator performance. It is found that for a constant peak-to-peak voltage the maximum velocity produced by the actuator depends directly on the dielectric surface temperature. The findings suggest that by changing the actuator temperature the performance can be maintained or even altered at different environmental conditions. Increasing dielectric surface temperature can increase the plasma actuator performance by increasing the momentum flux whilst consuming slightly higher energy.

== Influence of rain ==
Although plasma actuators have been extensively characterized for their performance as flow control devices, the notion that they might fail under adverse conditions such as dew, drizzle or dust makes them less popular in practical applications. Earlier publications have shown the effect of moisture, water adhesion, and even icing. A recent publication has simulated light rain by directly spraying water droplets on to a working plasma actuator and showed its effect on thrust recovery as the performance metric. It was shown that wet actuators quickly recover plasma glow, and gradually regain thrust comparable to the dry actuator.

== Flow control applications ==
Some recent applications of plasma actuation include high-speed flow control using localized arc filament plasma actuators, and low-speed flow control using dielectric barrier discharges for flow separation, replacing mechanical high-lift devices, 3D wake control, sound control, andsliding discharges. The present research of plasma actuators is mainly focused on three directions: (1) various designs of plasma actuators; (2) flow control applications; and (3) control-oriented modeling of flow applications under plasma actuation. In addition, new experimental and numerical methods are being developed to provide physical insights.

=== Vortex generator ===
A plasma actuator induces a local flow speed perturbation, which will be developed downstream to a vortex sheet. As a result, plasma actuators can behave as vortex generators. The difference between this and traditional vortex generation is that there are no mechanical moving parts or any drilling holes on aerodynamic surfaces, demonstrating an important benefit of plasma actuators. Three dimensional actuators such as Serpentine geometry plasma actuator generate streamwise oriented vortices, which are useful to control the flow. Recent work showed significant turbulent drag reduction by modifying energetic modes of transitional flow using these actuators.

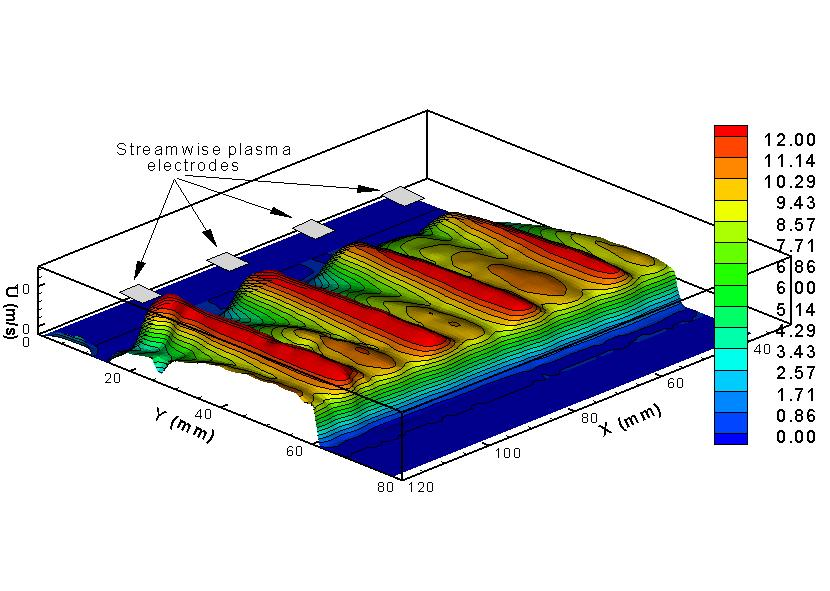
Plasma induced flow field

=== Active noise control ===
Active noise control normally denotes noise cancellation, that is, a noise-cancellation speaker emits a sound wave with the same amplitude but with inverted phase (also known as antiphase) to the original sound. However, active noise control with plasma adopts different strategies. The first one uses the discovery that sound pressure could be attenuated when it passes through a plasma sheet. The second one, and being more widely used, is to actively suppress the flow-field that is responsible to flow-induced noise (also known as aeroacoustics), using plasma actuators. It has been demonstrated that both tonal noise and broadband noise (difference can refer to tonal versus broadband) can be actively attenuated by a carefully designed plasma actuator.

=== Supersonic and hypersonic flow control ===
Plasma has been introduced to hypersonic flow control. Firstly, plasma could be much easier generated for hypersonic vehicle at high altitude with quite low atmospheric pressure and high surface temperature. Secondly, the classical aerodynamic surface has little actuation for the case.

Interest in plasma actuators as active flow control devices is growing rapidly due to their lack of mechanical parts, light weight and high response frequency. The characteristics of a dielectric barrier discharge (DBD) plasma actuator when exposed to an unsteady flow generated by a shock tube is examined. A Study shows that not only is the shear layer outside of the shock tube affected by the plasma but the passage of the shock front and high-speed flow behind it also greatly influences the properties of the plasma

=== Flight control ===
Plasma actuators could be mounted on the airfoil to control flight attitude and thereafter flight trajectory. The cumbersome design and maintenance efforts of mechanical and hydraulic transmission systems in a classical rudder can thus be saved. The price to pay is that one should design a suitable high voltage/power electric system satisfying EMC rule. Hence, in addition to flow control, plasma actuators hold potential in top-level flight control, in particular for UAV and extraterrestrial planet (with suitable atmospheric conditions) investigations.

On the other hand, the whole flight control strategy should be reconsidered taking account of characteristics of plasma actuators. One preliminary roll control system with DBD plasma actuators is shown in the figure.

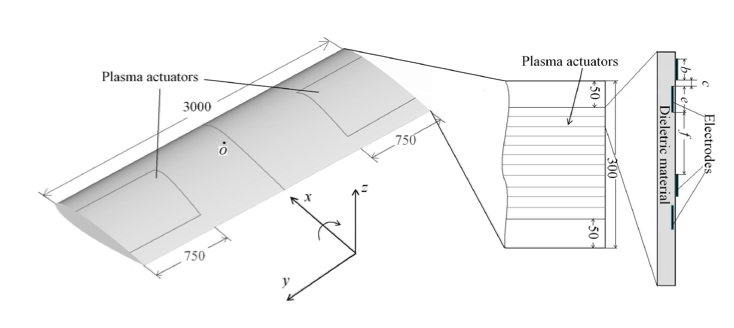
DBD Plasma actuators deployed on a NACA 0015 airfoil to do rudderless flight control

It can be seen that plasma actuators deployed on the both sides of an airfoil. The roll control can be controlled by activating plasma actuators according to the roll angle feedback. After studying various feedback control methodologies, the bang–bang control method was chosen to design the roll control system based on plasma actuators. The reason is that bang-bang control is time optimal and insensitive to plasma actuations, which quickly vary in difference atmospheric and electric conditions.

Another study for rolling moment control using three-dimensional actuation has also been reported for an aircraft wing where actuators were employed as the leading-edge slat, spoiler, flap, and leading-edge aileron. Results show that the serpentine plasma actuators may be employed as high-lift devices (as DBD slat and DBD spoiler) working at low Reynolds numbers and they can have the same effect of a conventional aileron for normal flight maneuvering, with low power consumption.

=== Heat transfer ===
Plasma-actuated heat transfer (or plasma-assisted heat transfer) is a method of cooling hot surfaces assisted by an electrostatic fluid accelerator (EFA) such as a dielectric barrier discharge (DBD) plasma actuator or corona discharge plasma actuator. Plasma-actuated heat transfer is one of the proposed applications of DBD plasma actuators, and needle plasma actuator.

==== Forced cooling ====
All electronic devices generate excess heat which must be removed to prevent premature failure of the device. Since heating occurs at the device, a common method of thermal management for electronics is to generate a bulk flow (for example by external fans) which brings the cooler, ambient air into contact with the hot device. A net heat transfer occurs between the hotter electronics and cooler air, lowering the mean temperature of the electronics. In plasma-actuated heat transfer, EFA plasma actuators generate a secondary flow to the bulk flow, cause local fluid acceleration near the plasma actuator, and ultimately may thin the thermal and velocity boundary layer near the electronics. The result is that the cooler air is brought closer to the hot electronics, improving the forced air cooling. Plasma-actuated heat transfer may be used as a thermal management solution for mobile devices, notebooks, ultra-mobile computers, and other electronics or in other applications which use similar forced air cooling configurations.

==== Film cooling ====
Rendering of a turbine blade with cooling holes for film cooling. Cool air is blown through the holes providing an insulating layer for the blade from the hot external environment.

In engineering applications which experience significantly high temperature environments such as those encountered in gas turbine blades, hot structures must be cooled to mitigate thermal stresses and structural failure. In those applications, one of the most common techniques used is film cooling where a secondary fluid such as air or another coolant is introduced to a surface in a high temperature environment. The secondary fluid provides a cooler, insulating layer (or film) along the surface that acts as a heat sink, lowering the mean temperature in the boundary layer. Since the secondary fluid is injected onto the surface at discrete holes on the surface, a portion of the secondary fluid is blown off the surface (especially at high momentum ratios of injected air to cross flow), decreasing the effectiveness of the film cooling process. In plasma-actuated heat transfer, EFA plasma actuators are used to control the secondary fluid via a dynamic force which promotes attachment of the secondary fluid to the hot surface and improves the effectiveness of the film cooling.

== Modeling ==
Various numerical models have been proposed to simulate plasma actuations in flow control. They are listed below according to the computational cost, from the most expensive to the cheapest.

- Monte carlo method plus particle-in-cell;
- Electricity modeling coupled with Navier-Stokes equations;
- Lumped element model coupled with Navier-Stokes equations
- Surrogate model to simulate plasma actuation.

The most important potential of plasma actuators is its ability to bridge fluids and electricity. A modern closed-loop control system and the following information theoretical methods can be applied to the relatively classical aerodynamic sciences. A control-oriented model for plasma actuation in flow control has been proposed for a cavity flow control case.

== See also ==
- Ion thruster
- Serpentine geometry plasma actuator
- Wingless Electromagnetic Air Vehicle
- Dielectric barrier discharge
