= Plasma pencil =

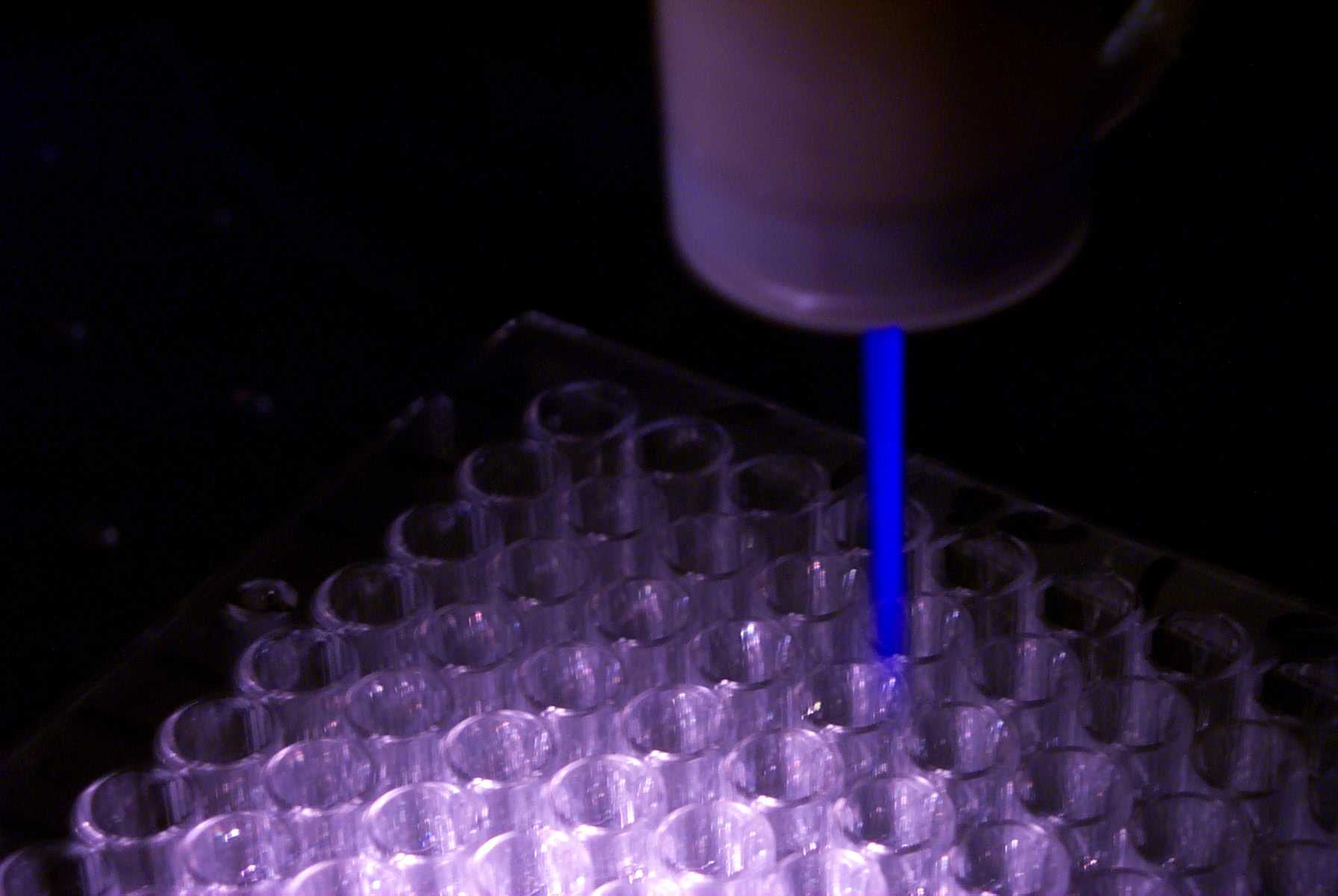
Plasma pencil

The plasma pencil is a dielectric tube where two disk-shaped electrodes of about the same diameter as the tube are inserted, and are separated by a small gap. Each of the two electrodes is made of a thin copper ring attached to the surface of a centrally perforated dielectric disk. The plasma is ignited when nanoseconds-wide high voltage pulses at kHz repetition rate are applied between the two electrodes and a gas mixture (such as helium and oxygen) is flown through the holes of the electrodes. When a plasma is ignited in the gap between the electrodes, a plasma plume reaching lengths up to 12 cm is launched through the aperture of the outer electrode and into the surrounding room air. The cold plasma plume emitted by the plasma pencil can be used to kill bacteria without harming skin tissue.

Applications of the plasma pencil are in wound healing, killing of oral bacteria, and in controlled surface modification of heat-sensitive materials. The plasma pencil was invented by Mounir Laroussi, a plasma science professor at Old Dominion University, Norfolk, VA, USA.

== Sources ==
- Laroussi, M.; Lu, X. (2005-09-12). "Room-temperature atmospheric pressure plasma plume for biomedical applications". Applied Physics Letters. 87 (11). AIP Publishing: 113902. Bibcode:2005ApPhL..87k3902L. doi:10.1063/1.2045549. ISSN 0003-6951.
- Laroussi, Mounir; Tendero, Claire; Lu, Xinpei; Alla, Sudhakar; Hynes, Wayne L. (2006-08-15). "Inactivation of Bacteria by the Plasma Pencil". Plasma Processes and Polymers. 3 (6–7). Wiley: 470–473. doi:10.1002/ppap.200600005. ISSN 1612-8850.
