= Flow control (fluid) =

Field of fluid dynamics

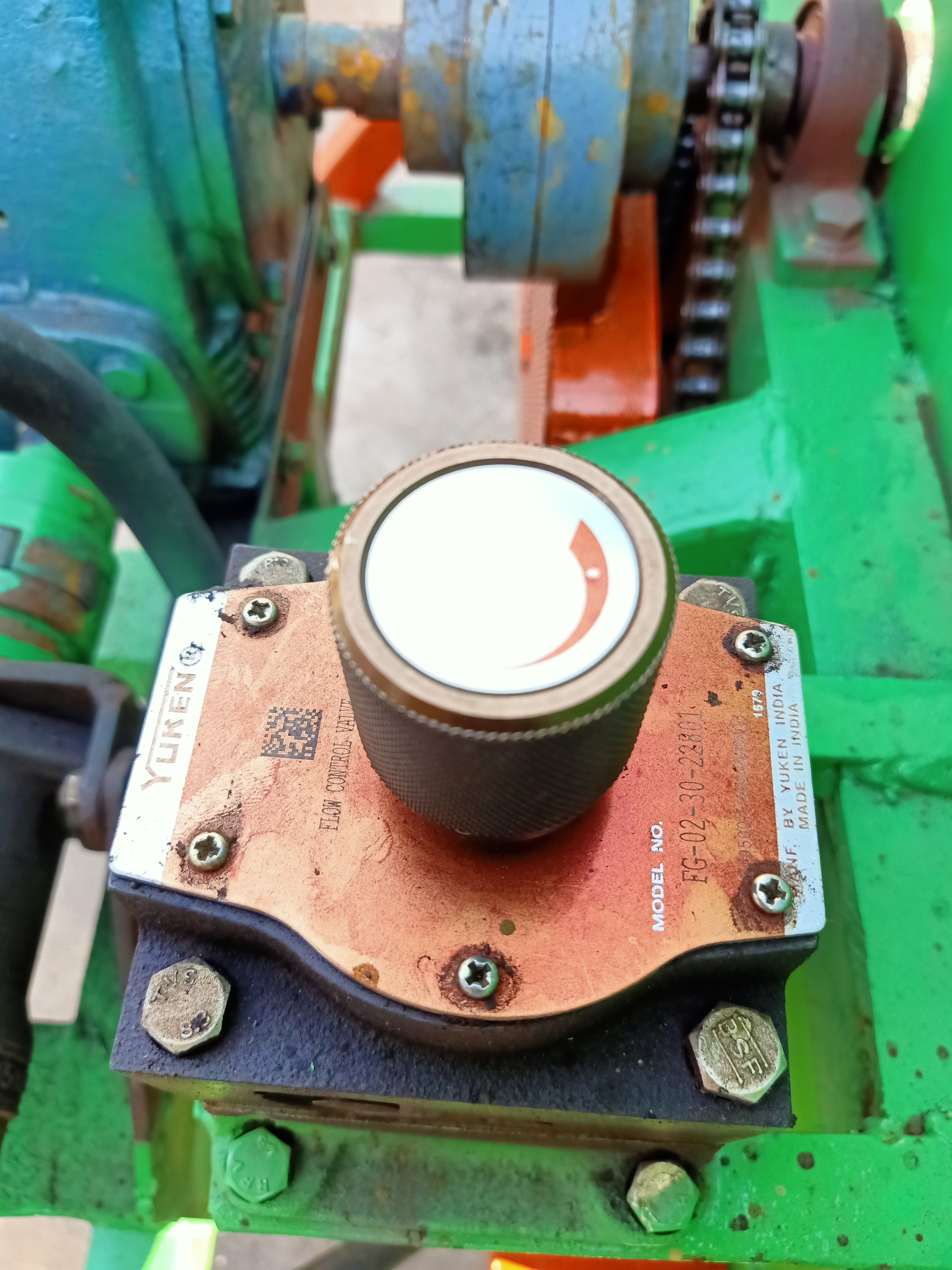
Hydraulic Flow controller

Flow control is a field of fluid dynamics. It involves a small configuration change to serve an ideally large engineering benefit, like drag reduction, lift increase, mixing enhancement or noise reduction. This change may be accomplished by passive or active devices.

== Passive vs active ==
Passive devices by definition require no energy. Passive techniques include turbulators or roughness elements geometric shaping, the use of vortex generators, and the placement of longitudinal grooves or riblets on airfoil surfaces.

Active control requires actuators that require energy and may operate in a time-dependent manner. Active flow control includes steady or unsteady suction or blowing, the use of synthetic jets, valves and plasma actuators. Actuation may be pre-determined (open-loop control) or be dependent on monitoring sensors (closed-loop control).

== Aircraft wings ==
Airplane wing performance has a substantial effect on not only runway length, approach speed, climb rate, cargo capacity, and operation range but also noise and emissions. Wing performance can be degraded by flow separation, which depends on the aerodynamic characteristics of the airfoil. Aerodynamic and non-aerodynamic constraints often conflict. Flow control is required to overcome such difficulties. Techniques developed to manipulate the boundary layer, either to increase lift or decrease drag, and separation delay come under the general heading of flow control.

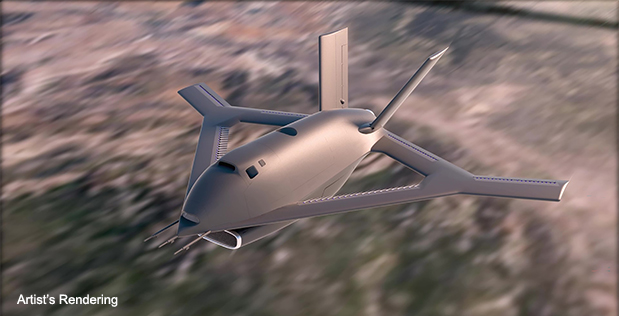
Aurora X-65 CRANE using active flow control actuators for primary flight control

Aurora Flight Sciences is a DARPA CRANE (Control of Revolutionary Aircraft with Novel Effectors) grantee. It initially involved testing a small-scale plane that uses compressed air bursts instead of external moving parts such as flaps. The program seeks to eliminate the weight, drag, and mechanical complexity involved in moving control surfaces. The air bursts modify the air pressure and flow, and change the boundaries between streams of air moving at different speeds. The company built a 25% scale prototype with 11 conventional control surfaces, as well as 14 banks fed by eight air channels. In 2023, the aircraft received its official designation as X-65. In January 2024, DARPA and Aurora started CRANE Phase 3, building the first full-scale X-65 aircraft using active flow control actuators for primary flight control. The 7,000-pound X-65 will be rolled out in early 2025 with the first flight planned for summer of 2025.
