= List of fusor examples =

The following is a list of fusor examples, examples of the fusor-type nuclear fusion reactor that uses inertial electrostatic confinement

== Professional ==
Fusors have been theoretically studied at multiple institutions, including: Kyoto University, and Kyushu University. Researchers meet annually at the US-Japan Workshop on Inertial Electrostatic Confinement Fusion. The following is a list of machines that were actually built.

- Tokyo Institute of Technology has four IEC devices of different shapes: a spherical machine, a cylindrical device, a co-axial double cylinder and a magnetically assisted device.
- University of Wisconsin-Madison A group at Wisconsin-Madison has been running a very large, funded, fusor program since 1991.
- Turkish Atomic Energy Authority In 2013 this team built a 30 cm (12 in) fusor at the Saraykoy Nuclear Research and Training center in Turkey. This fusor can reach 85 kV and do deuterium fusion, producing 2.4×10^{4} neutrons per second.
- University of Illinois Dr. George Miley's team at the fusion studies laboratory has built a ~25 cm (9.8 in) fusor which has produced 1×10^{7} neutrons per second using deuterium gas.
- University of Sydney Dr. Joseph Khachan's group in the Department of Physics has built a variety of IEC devices in both positive and negative polarities and spherical and cylindrical geometries.
- Atomic Energy Organization of Iran Researchers at Shahid Beheshti University in Iran have built a 60 cm (24 in) diameter fusor which can produce 1×10^{7} neutrons per second at 140 kV using deuterium gas.
- Los Alamos National Laboratory In the late nineties, researchers purposed and built a fusor-like system for oscillating plasma, inside a fusor. This device is known as the Periodically Oscillating Plasma Sphere or POPS.
- Massachusetts Institute of Technology For his doctoral thesis in 2007, Carl Dietrich built a fusor and studied its potential use in spacecraft propulsion. In addition, Tom McGuire did his thesis on fusors with multiple cages and ion guns.
- ITT Corporation Hirschs original machine was a 17.8 cm (7.0 in) diameter machine with 150 kV voltage drop across it. This machine used ion beams.
- Phoenix Nuclear Labs has developed a commercial neutron source based on a fusor, achieving 3×10^{11} neutrons per second with the deuterium-deuterium fusion reaction.

== Amateur ==
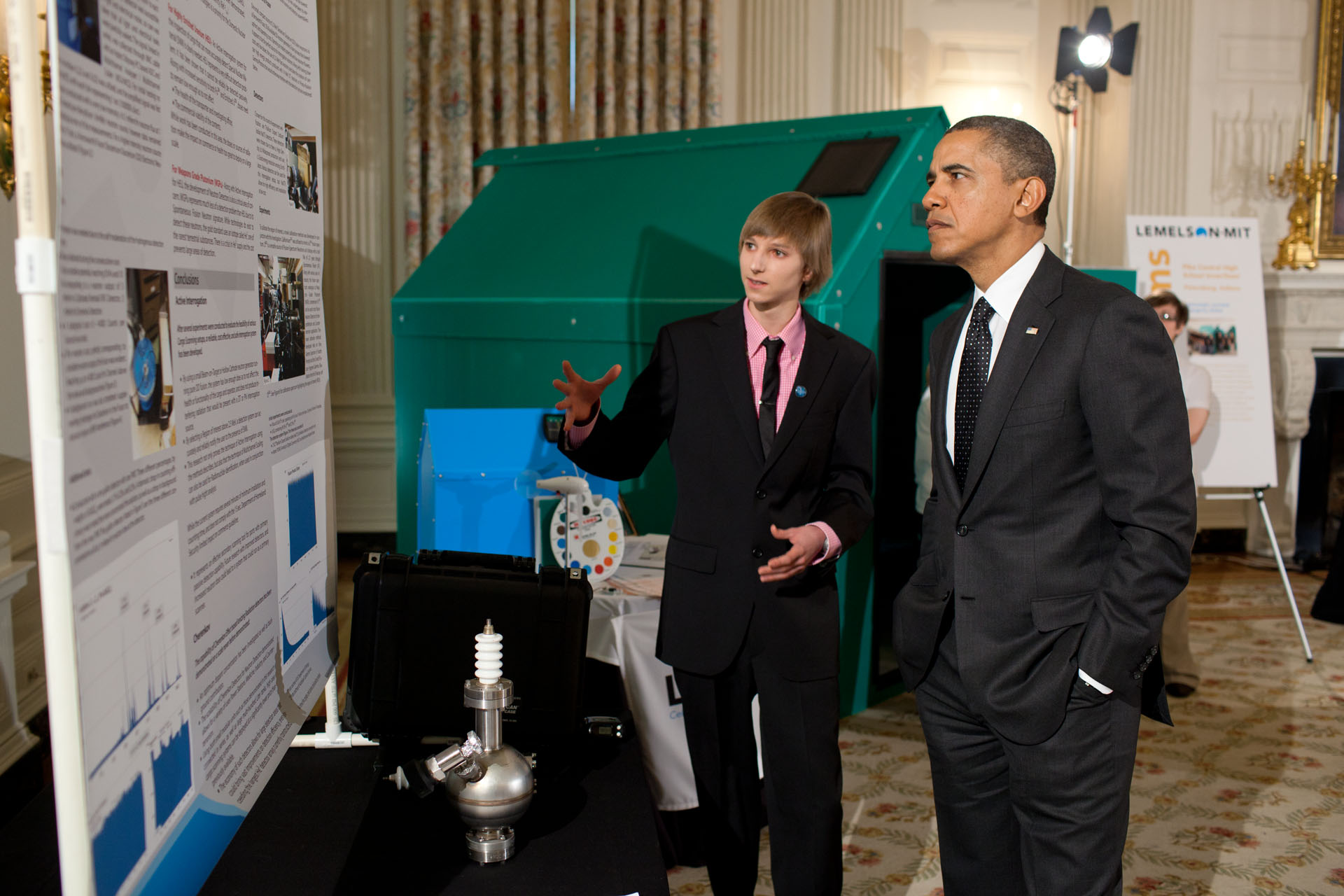
Taylor Wilson presenting fusor work to Barack Obama, February 7, 2012

A number of amateurs have built working fusors and detected neutrons. Many fusor enthusiasts connect on forums and message boards online. Below are some examples of working fusors.

- Richard Hull Since the late nineties, Richard Hull has built several fusors in his home in Richmond, Virginia. In March 1999, he achieved a neutron rate of 10×10^{5} neutrons per second. Hull maintains a list of amateurs who have detected neutrons from fusors.
- Carl Greninger Founded the Northwest Nuclear Consortium, an organization in Washington state which teaches a class of a dozen high school students nuclear engineering principles using a 60 kV fusor.
- Taylor Wilson built a Fusor at 14 years old in 2008.
- Jackson Oswalt built a Fusor at 12 years age in 2018. He is youngest person to achieve nuclear fusion as described by Guinness World Records
- Matthew Honickman Was a high school student who built a working fusor in his basement in Rochester, New York.
- Michael Li In 2003, Michael Li became the youngest person to date to build a fusor, winning second place in the US Intel Science Talent Search winning a $75,000 college scholarship.
- Mark Suppes A web designer for Gucci in Brooklyn New York, built a working fusor on a path to building the first amateur Polywell.
- Thiago David Olson Built a 40 kV fusor at age 17, in his home in Rochester, Michigan and placed second in the International Science and Engineering Fair in 2007.
- Jamie Edwards who fused the atom at 13, at his middle school in England. He received a letter from the Duke of York, was invited on The David Letterman Show and gave a TED talk.
- Conrad Farnsworth of Newcastle, Wyoming produced fusion in 2011 at 17 and used this to win a regional and state science fair.

== See also ==
- Inertial confinement fusion
- Nuclear fusion
