= Tabletop fusion =

Tabletop fusion, nuclear fusion on the tabletop, can be achieved with:

- Bubble fusion (sonofusion), an application of the rapid collapse of bubbles induced by sound waves
- Pyroelectric fusion, an application of intense electric fields within a crystal
- Inertial electrostatic confinement fusion, an application of intense electric fields
  - Fusor, an inertial electrostatic confinement based fusion reactor design, some of which are sized to fit on tables
