= Neutron source =

Device that emits neutrons

A neutron source is any device that emits neutrons, irrespective of the mechanism used to produce the neutrons. Neutron sources are used in physics, engineering, medicine, nuclear weapons, petroleum exploration, biology, chemistry, and nuclear power. Neutron source variables include the energy of the neutrons emitted by the source, the rate of neutrons emitted by the source, the size of the source, the cost of owning and maintaining the source, and government regulations related to the source.

== Small devices ==
=== Spontaneous fission ===
Some isotopes undergo spontaneous fission (SF) with emission of neutrons. The most common spontaneous fission source is the isotope californium-252. ^{252}Cf and all other SF neutron sources are made by irradiating uranium or a transuranic element in a nuclear reactor, where neutrons are absorbed in the starting material and its subsequent reaction products, transmuting the starting material into the SF isotope. ^{252}Cf neutron sources are typically 1/4" to 1/2" in diameter and 1" to 2" in length. A typical ^{252}Cf neutron source emits 10^{7} to 10^{9} neutrons per second when new; but with a half-life of 2.6 years, neutron output drops by half in 2.6 years.

=== Alpha decay ===
Neutrons are produced when alpha particles hit any of several light isotopes including isotopes of beryllium, carbon, or oxygen. Thus, a neutron source can be fabricated by mixing an alpha-emitter such as radium, polonium, or americium with a low-atomic-weight isotope, usually by blending powders of the two materials. Alpha neutron sources typically produce ~10^{6}–10^{8} neutrons per second. An alpha-beryllium neutron source may produce about 30 neutrons per 10^{6} alpha particles. The useful lifetime for such sources depends on the half-life of the radioisotope. The size and cost of these neutron sources are comparable to spontaneous fission sources. Usual combinations of materials are plutonium-beryllium (PuBe), americium-beryllium (AmBe), or americium-lithium (AmLi).

=== Photodisintegration ===
Gamma radiation with an energy exceeding the neutron binding energy of a nucleus can eject a neutron, a process known as photodisintegration. Two example reactions are:

- ^{9}Be + >1.7 MeV photon → 1 neutron + 2 ^{4}He
- ^{2}H (deuterium) + >2.26 MeV photon → 1 neutron + ^{1}H

=== Sealed-tube neutron generators ===
Some accelerator-based neutron generators induce fusion between beams of deuterium and/or tritium ions and metal hydride targets which also contain these isotopes.

== Medium-sized devices ==
=== Dense plasma focus ===
The dense plasma focus neutron source produces controlled nuclear fusion by creating a dense plasma within which heats ionized deuterium and/or tritium gas to temperatures sufficient for creating fusion.

=== Inertial electrostatic confinement ===
Inertial electrostatic confinement devices such as the Farnsworth-Hirsch fusor use an electric field to heat a plasma to fusion conditions and produce neutrons. Various applications from a hobby enthusiast scene up to commercial applications have developed, mostly in the US.

=== Light ion accelerators ===
Traditional particle accelerators with hydrogen, deuterium, or tritium ion sources may be used to produce neutrons using targets of deuterium, tritium, lithium, beryllium, and other low-Z materials. Typically these accelerators operate with energies in the > 1 MeV range.

=== Bremsstrahlung systems ===
In a bremsstrahlung system, neutrons are produced when photons above the nuclear binding energy of a substance are incident on that substance, causing it to undergo giant dipole resonance after which it either emits a neutron (photoneutron) or undergoes fission (photofission). The number of neutrons released by each fission event is dependent on the substance. Typically photons begin to produce neutrons on interaction with normal matter at energies of about 7 to 40 MeV, which means that radiotherapy facilities using megavoltage X-rays also produce neutrons, and some require neutron shielding. In addition, electrons of energy over about 50 MeV may induce giant dipole resonance in nuclides by a mechanism which is the inverse of internal conversion and thus produce neutrons by a mechanism similar to that of photoneutrons.

== Large devices ==
=== Nuclear fission reactors ===
Nuclear fission within a reactor, produces many neutrons and can be used for a variety of purposes including power generation and experiments. Research reactors are often specially designed to allow placement of material samples into a high neutron flux environment.

=== Nuclear fusion systems ===
Nuclear fusion, the fusing of heavy isotopes of hydrogen, has the potential to produces large numbers of neutrons. Small scale fusion systems exist for (plasma) research purposes at many universities and laboratories around the world. A small number of large scale fusion experiments also exist including the National Ignition Facility in the US, JET in the UK, and soon the ITER experiment currently under construction in France. None are yet used as neutron sources.

Inertial confinement fusion has the potential to produce orders of magnitude more neutrons than spallation. This could be useful for neutron radiography which can be used to locate hydrogen atoms in structures, resolve atomic thermal motion and study collective excitation of nuclei more effectively than X-rays.

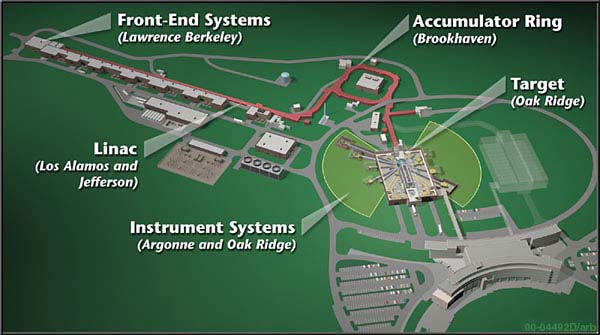
SNS complex

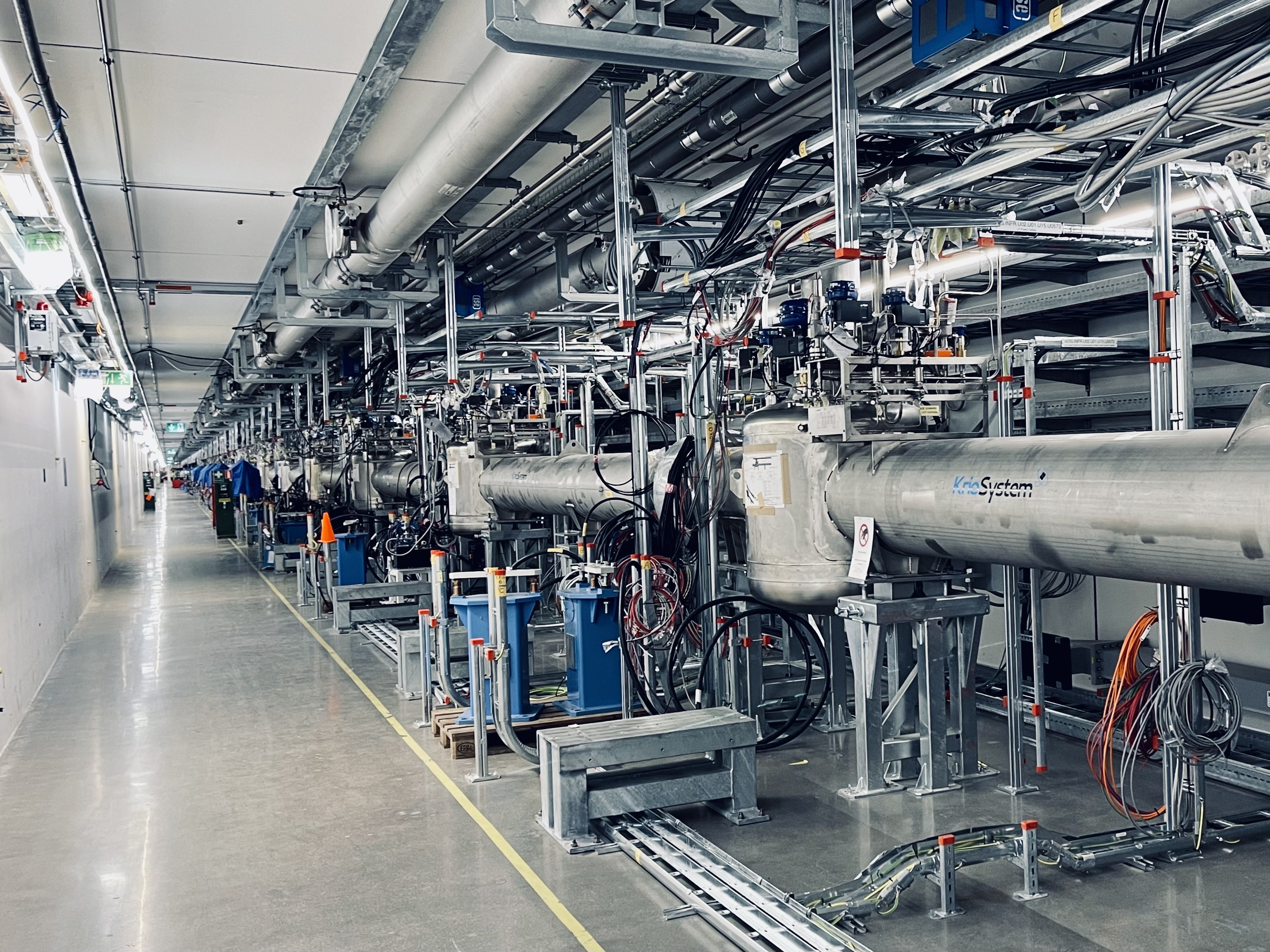
ESS linac tunnel

=== High-energy particle accelerators ===
A spallation source is a high-flux source in which protons that have been accelerated to high energies hit a target, prompting emission of neutrons. The world's strongest neutron sources tend to be spallation based as high flux fission reactors have an upper bound of neutrons produced. As of 2022, the most powerful neutron source in the world is the Spallation Neutron Source in Oak Ridge, Tennessee, with the European Spallation Source in Lund, Sweden under construction to become the world's strongest intermediate duration pulsed neutron source.

Subcritical nuclear fission reactors are proposed to use spallation neutron sources and can be used both for nuclear transmutation (e.g. production of medical radionuclides or synthesis of precious metals) and for power generation as the energy required to produce one spallation neutron (~30 MeV at current technology levels) is almost an order of magnitude lower than the energy released by fission (~200 MeV for most fissile actinides).

Laser-driven neutron sources are further another emerging technology that uses ultra-intense laser pulses to produce neutrons through secondary nuclear reactions. When high-power lasers interact with dense targets, they generate high-energy particles such as protons or deuterons, which can then collide with a secondary material, inducing neutron emission. These sources are compact compared to traditional spallation or reactor-based facilities and provide unique capabilities, including ultra-short neutron bursts and high brilliance.

== Neutron flux ==
For most applications, higher neutron flux is better (since it reduces the time needed to do the experiment, acquire the image, etc.). Amateur fusion devices, like a fusor, generate only about 300 000 neutrons per second. Commercial fusor devices can generate on the order of 10^{9} neutrons per second, hence a usable flux of less than 10^{5} n/(cm^{2} s). Large neutron beams around the world achieve much greater flux. Reactor-based sources now produce 10^{15} n/(cm^{2} s), and spallation sources generate > 10^{17} n/(cm^{2} s).

== See also ==
- Californium neutron flux multiplier
- Neutron temperature ('fast' or 'slow')
- Startup neutron source
- Zetatron
