= Colliding beam fusion =

Fusion power concepts based on intersecting beams of fusion fuel ions

Colliding beam fusion (CBF), or colliding beam fusion reactor (CBFR), is a class of fusion power concepts that are based on two or more intersecting beams of fusion fuel ions that are independently accelerated to fusion energies using a variety of particle accelerator designs or other means. One of the beams may be replaced by a static target, in which case the approach is termed accelerator based fusion or beam-target fusion, but the physics is the same as colliding beams.

CBFR offers more efficient ways to provide the activation energy for fusion, by directly accelerating individual particles rather than heating a bulk fuel. The CBFR reactants are naturally non-thermal which gives them advantages, especially that they can directly carry enough energy to overcome the Coulomb barrier of aneutronic fusion fuels. This makes them attractive for use with alternative fuels like proton-boron, which cannot be used in traditional designs.

CBFRs face several problems that have limited their ability to be seriously considered as candidates for fusion power. When two ions collide, they are more likely to scatter than to fuse. Magnetic confinement fusion reactors overcome this problem using a bulk plasma and confining it for some time so that the ions have many thousands of chances to collide. Two beams colliding give ions little time to interact before the beams fly apart. This limits how much fusion power a beam-beam machine can make.

Several designs have sought to address the shortcomings of earlier CBFRs, including Migma, MARBLE, MIX, and other beam-based concepts. These attempt to overcome the fundamental challenges of CBFR by applying radio waves, bunching beams together, increasing recirculation, or applying some quantum effects. None of these approaches have succeeded yet.

== Conventional fusion ==
Fusion takes place when atoms come into close proximity and the nuclear force pulls their nuclei together to form a single larger nucleus. Counteracting this process is the positive charge of the nuclei, which repel each other due to the electrostatic force. For fusion to occur, the nuclei must have enough energy to overcome this coulomb barrier. The barrier is lower for atoms with less positive charge: those with the fewest protons in the nucleus. The nuclear force increases with more nucleons: the total number of protons and neutrons. This means that a combination of deuterium and tritium has the lowest coulomb barrier, at about 100 keV (see requirements for fusion).

When the fuel is heated to high energies the electrons disassociate from the nuclei, which are left as individual ions and electrons mixed in a gas-like plasma. Particles in a gas are distributed across a wide range of energies in a spectrum known as the Maxwell–Boltzmann distribution. At any given temperature the majority of the particles are at lower energies, with a "long tail" containing smaller numbers of particles at much higher energies. So while 100 keV represents a temperature of over one billion degrees, to produce fusion events, the fuel does not need to be heated to this temperature as a whole: some reactions will occur even at lower temperatures due to the small number of high-energy particles in the mix.

As the fusion reactions give off large amounts of energy, and some of that energy will be deposited back in the fuel, these reactions heat the fuel. There is a critical temperature at which the rate of reactions, and thus the energy deposited, balances losses to the environment. At this point the reaction becomes self-sustaining, a point known as ignition. For D-T fuel, that temperature is between 50 and 100 million degrees. The overall rate of fusion and net energy release is dependent on the combination of temperature, density and energy confinement time, known as the fusion triple product.

Two primary approaches have developed to attack the fusion power problem. In the inertial confinement approach, the fuel is quickly squeezed to extremely high densities, which also increases the internal temperature through the adiabatic process. There is no attempt to maintain these conditions for any period of time, the fuel explodes outward as soon as the external force is released. The confinement time is on the order of microseconds, so the temperatures and density must be very high for any appreciable amount of the fuel to undergo fusion. This approach has been successful in producing fusion reactions, but to date, the devices that can provide the compression, typically lasers, require far more energy than the reactions produce.

The more widely studied approach is magnetic confinement. Since the plasma is electrically charged, it will follow magnetic lines of force and a suitable arrangement of fields can keep the fuel away from the container walls. The fuel is then heated over an extended period until some of the fuel in the tail starts undergoing fusion. At the temperatures and densities that are possible using magnets the fusion process is fairly slow, so this approach requires long confinement times on the order of tens of seconds, or minutes. Confining a gas at millions of degrees for this sort of time scale has proven difficult, although modern experimental machines are approaching the conditions needed for net power production, or "breakeven".

== Direct acceleration ==
The energy levels needed to overcome the coulomb barrier, about 100 keV for D-T fuel, corresponds to millions of degrees, but is within the energy range that can be provided by even the smallest particle accelerators. For instance, the very first cyclotron, built in 1932, was capable of producing 4.8 MeV in a device that fit on a tabletop.

The original earthbound fusion reactions were created by such a device at the Cavendish Laboratory at Cambridge University. In 1934, Mark Oliphant, Paul Harteck and Ernest Rutherford used a new type of power supply to power a device not unlike an electron gun to shoot deuterium nuclei into a metal foil infused with deuterium, lithium or other light elements. This apparatus allowed them to study the nuclear cross section of the various reactions, and it was their work that produced the 100 keV figure.

The chance that any given deuteron will hit one of the deuterium atoms in the metal foil is vanishingly small. The experiment only succeeded because it ran for extended periods, and the rare reactions that did occur were so powerful that they could not be missed. But as the basis of a system for power production it simply wouldn't work; the vast majority of the accelerated deuterons goes right through the foil without undergoing a collision, and all the energy put into accelerating it is lost. The small number of reactions that do occur give off far less energy than what is fed into the accelerator.

A somewhat related concept was explored by Stanislaw Ulam and Jim Tuck at Los Alamos shortly after World War II. In this system, deuterium was infused into metal like the Cavendish experiments, but then formed into a cone and inserted into shaped charge warheads. Two such warheads were aimed at each other and fired, forming rapidly moving jets of deuterized metal that collided. These experiments were carried out in 1946 but failed to turn up any evidence of fusion reactions.

=== Beam-target systems ===
To illustrate the difficulty of building a beam-target fusion system, we will consider one promising fusion fuel, the proton-boron cycle, or p-B11.

Boron can be formed into highly purified solid blocks, and protons easily produced by ionizing hydrogen gas. The protons can be accelerated and fired into the boron block, and the reactions will cause several alpha particles to be released. These can be collected in an electrostatic system to directly produce electricity without having to use a Rankine cycle or a similar heat-driven system. As the reactions create no neutrons directly, they have many practical advantages for safety also.

The chance of a collision is maximized when the protons have an energy of about 675 keV. When they fuse, the alphas carry away a total of 8.7 MeV. Some of that energy, 0.675 MeV, must be recycled into the accelerator to produce new protons to continue the process, and the generation and acceleration process is unlikely to be much more than 50% efficient. This still leaves ample net energy to close the cycle. However, this assumes every proton causes a fusion event, which does not occur. Considering the probability of a reaction, the resultant cycle is:

E_{net} = 8.7 MeVζ_{p}ζ_{B} - 0.675 MeV

where ζ_{p} and ζ_{B} are the probabilities that any given proton or boron will undergo a reaction. Re-arranging, we can show that:

ζ_{p}ζ_{B} = 0.67 MeV / 8.6 MeV = 1/13

That means that to break even, the system needs at least 1/13 of the particles to undergo fusion. To ensure that a proton has a chance to collide with a boron, it must travel past many boron atoms. The collision rate is:

n_{events} = σ ρ d

where σ is the nuclear cross section between a proton and boron, ρ is the density of boron, and d is the average distance the proton travels through the boron before undergoing a fusion reaction. For p-B11, σ is 0.9 × 10^{−24} cm^{−2}, ρ is 2.535 g/cm^{3}, and thus d ~ 8 cm. However, travelling through the block causes the proton to ionize the boron atoms it passes, which slows the proton. At 0.675 MeV, this process slows the proton to sub-keV energies in about 10^{−4} cm, many orders of magnitude less than what is required.

=== Colliding beams ===
Things can be somewhat improved by using two accelerators firing at each other instead of a single accelerator and a non-moving target. In this case, the second fuel, boron in the example above, is already ionized, so the "ionization drag" seen by the protons entering the solid block is eliminated.

In this case, however, the concept of a characteristic interaction length has no meaning as there is no solid target. Instead, for these types of system, the typical measure is to use the beam luminosity, L, a term that combines the reaction cross-section with the number of events per unit of time. The term is normally defined as:

L = 1/σdN/dt

For this discussion, we will re-arrange it to extract the collisional frequency:

dN/dt = σ L

Each of these collisions will produce 8.7 MeV, so multiplying by dN/dt gives the power. Given the cross-section, to generate N collisions per unit of time one requires a luminosity L. Generating luminosity L requires power, so one can calculate the amount of power needed to produce a given amount of luminosity L through:

L = P/(σ 8.76 MeV)

If we set P to 1 MW, equivalent to a small wind turbine, this requires a luminosity L of 10^{42} cm^{−2}s^{−1}. For comparison, the world record for luminosity set by the Large Hadron Collider in 2017 was 2.06 × 10^{34} cm^{−2}s^{−1}, more than seven orders of magnitude too low.

== Intersecting beams ==
Given the extremely low interaction cross-sections, the number of particles required in the reaction area is enormous, well beyond any existing technology. But this assumes that the particles in question only get one pass through the system. If the particles that missed collisions can be recycled in a way that their energy can be retained and the particles have multiple chances to collide, the energy imbalance can be reduced.

One such solution would be to place the reaction area of a two-beam system between the poles of a powerful magnet. The field will cause the electrically charged particles to bend around into circular paths and come back into the reaction area again. However, such systems naturally defocus the particles, so this will not lead them back to their original trajectories accurately enough to produce the densities desired.

A better solution is to use a dedicated storage ring which includes focusing systems to maintain the beam accuracy. However, these only accept particles in a relatively narrow selection of original trajectories. If two particles approach closely and scatter off at an angle, they will no longer recycle into the storage area. It is easy to show that the loss rate from such scatterings is far greater than the fusion rate. Many attempts have been made to address this scattering problem.

=== Migma ===
The Migma device is perhaps the first significant attempt to solve the recirculation problem. It uses a storage system that was, in effect, an infinite number of storage rings arranged at different locations and angles. This is not done by added components or hardware configurations, but via careful arrangement of the magnetic fields within a wide but flat cylindrical vacuum chamber. Only ions undergoing very high angle scattering events would be lost, and calculations suggest that the rate of these events was such that any given ion would pass through the reaction area 10^{8} times before scattering out. This would be enough to sustain positive energy output.

Several Migma devices were built and showed some promise, but it did not progress beyond moderately sized devices. Several theoretical concerns were raised based on space charge limit considerations, which suggested that increasing the density of the fuel to useful levels would require enormous magnets to confine it. During funding rounds the system became mired in an acrimonious debate with the various energy agencies and further development ended in the 1980s.

=== Tri-Alpha ===
A similar concept is being attempted by TAE Technologies, formerly Tri-Alpha Energy (TAE), based largely on the ideas of Norman Rostoker, a professor at University of California, Irvine. Early publications from the early 1990s show devices using conventional intersecting storage rings and refocussing arrangements, but later documents from 1996 on use a very different system firing fuel ions into a field-reversed configuration (FRC).

The FRC is a self-stable arrangement of plasma which geometry looks like a mix of a vortex ring and a thick-walled tube. The magnetic fields keep the particles trapped between the tube walls, circulating rapidly. TAE intends to first produce a stable FRC, and then use accelerators to fire additional fuel ions into it so they become trapped. The ions make up for any radiative losses from the FRC, and inject more magnetic helicity into the FRC to keep its shape. The ions from the accelerators collide to produce fusion.

When the concept was first revealed, it garnered several negative reviews in the journals. These issues were explained away and the construction of several small experimental devices followed. As of 2018, the best-reported performance of the system is approximately 10^{−12} away from breakeven. In early 2019, it was announced that the system would instead be developed using conventional D-T fuels and the company changed its name to TAE.

== Inertial electrostatic confinement ==
Several types of inertial electrostatic confinement (IEC) devices are proposed as reactors.

=== Fusor ===
The classic example of an IEC device is a fusor. A typical Fusor has two spherical metal cages, one inside another, in a vacuum. A high voltage is placed between the two cages. Fuel gas injected. The fuel ionizes and is accelerated toward the inner cage. Ions that miss the inner cage can fuse together.

Fusors are not considered part of the CBFR family, because they do not traditionally use beams.

There are many problems with the fusor as a fusion power reactor. One is that the electrical grids are charged to the point where there is a strong mechanical force pulling them together, which limits how small the grid materials can be. This results in a minimum rate of collisions between the ions and the grids, removing energy from the system. Additionally, these collisions spall off metal into the fuel, which causes it to rapidly lose energy through radiation. It may be that the smallest possible grid material is still large enough that collisions with the ions will remove energy from the system faster than the fusion rate. Beyond that, there are several loss mechanisms that suggest X-ray radiation from such a system will likewise remove energy faster than fusion can supply it.

=== N-Body ===
In 2017, the University of Maryland simulated an N-Body beam system to determine if recirculating ion-beams could reach fusion conditions. Models showed that the concept was fundamentally limited because it could not reach sufficient densities needed for fusion power.

=== Polywell ===
An attempt to avoid the grid-collision problems was made by Robert Bussard in his Polywell design. This uses cusp magnetic field arrangements to produce "virtual electrodes" consisting of trapped electrons. The result is to produce an accelerating field similar to one produced by the grid wires in the fusor, but with no wires. Collisions with the electrons in the virtual electrodes are possible, but unlike the fusor, these cause no losses via spalled-off metal ions.

The polywell's biggest flaw is its ability to hold a plasma negative for any significant amount of time. In practice, any significant amount of negative charge vanishes quickly. Further, analysis by Todd Rider in 1995 suggests that any system that has non-equilibrium plasmas will suffer rapid losses of energy via bremsstrahlung. Bremsstrahlung occurs when a charged particle is rapidly accelerated, causing it to radiate x-rays, and thereby lose energy. In the case of IEC devices, including both the fusor and polywell, the collisions between recently accelerated ions entering the reaction area and low-energy ions and electrons forms a lower limit on bremsstrahlung that appears to be far higher than any possible rate of fusion.
