= Fusor =

Apparatus to create nuclear fusion

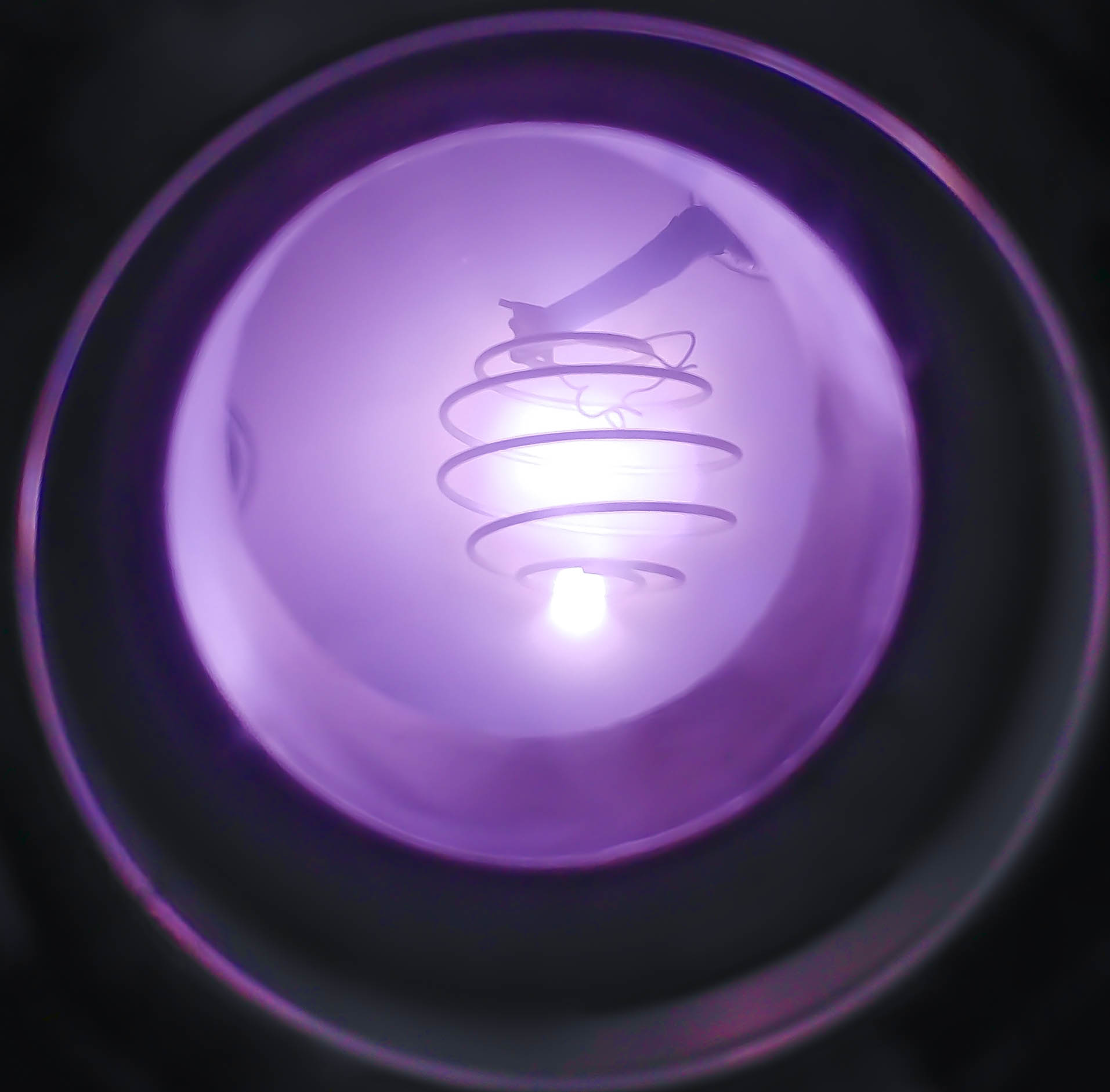
A homemade fusor

A fusor is a device that uses an electric field to heat ions to a temperature at which they undergo nuclear fusion. The machine induces a voltage between two metal cages inside a vacuum. Positive ions fall down this voltage drop, building up speed. If they collide in the center, they can fuse. This is one kind of an inertial electrostatic confinement device – the type studied in a branch of fusion research.

A Farnsworth–Hirsch fusor is the most common type of fusor. This design came from work by Philo T. Farnsworth in 1964 and Robert L. Hirsch in 1967. A variant type of fusor had been proposed previously by William Elmore, James L. Tuck, and Ken Watson at the Los Alamos National Laboratory though they never built the machine.

Fusors have been built by various institutions. These include academic institutions such as the University of Wisconsin–Madison, the Massachusetts Institute of Technology and government entities, such as the Atomic Energy Organization of Iran and the Turkish Atomic Energy Authority. Fusors have also been developed commercially, as sources for neutrons by DaimlerChrysler Aerospace and as a method for generating medical isotopes. Fusors have also become very popular for hobbyists and amateurs. A growing number of amateurs have performed nuclear fusion using simple fusor machines. However, fusors are not considered a viable concept for large-scale energy production by scientists.

== Mechanism ==
=== Underlying physics ===
Fusion takes place when nuclei approach to a distance where the nuclear force can pull them together into a single larger nucleus. Opposing this close approach are the positive charges in the nuclei, which force them apart due to the electrostatic force. In order to produce fusion events, the nuclei must have initial energy great enough to allow them to overcome this Coulomb barrier. As the nuclear force is increased with the number of nucleons, protons and neutrons, and the electromagnetic force is increased with the number of protons only, the easiest atoms to fuse are isotopes of hydrogen, deuterium with one neutron, and tritium with two. With hydrogen fuels, about 3 to 10 keV is needed to allow the reaction to take place.

Traditional approaches to fusion power have generally attempted to heat the fuel to temperatures where the Maxwell-Boltzmann distribution of their resulting energies is high enough that some of the particles in the long tail have the required energy. High enough in this case is such that the rate of the fusion reactions produces enough energy to offset energy losses to the environment and thus heat the surrounding fuel to the same temperatures and produce a self-sustaining reaction known as ignition. Calculations show this takes place at about 50 million kelvin (K), although higher numbers on the order of 100 million K are desirable in practical machines. Due to the extremely high temperatures, fusion reactions are also referred to as thermonuclear.

When atoms are heated to temperatures corresponding to thousands of degrees, the electrons become increasingly free of their nucleus. This leads to a gas-like state of matter known as a plasma, consisting of free nuclei known as ions, and their former electrons. As a plasma consists of free-moving charges, it can be controlled using magnetic and electrical fields. Fusion devices use this capability to retain the fuel at millions of degrees.

=== Fusor concept ===
The fusor is part of a broader class of devices that attempts to give the fuel fusion-relevant energies by directly accelerating the ions toward each other. In the case of the fusor, this is accomplished with electrostatic forces. For every volt that an ion of ±1 charge is accelerated across it gains 1 electronvolt in energy. To reach the required ~10 keV, a voltage of 10 kV is required, applied to both particles. For comparison, the electron gun in a typical television cathode-ray tube is on the order of 3 to 6 kV, so the complexity of such a device is fairly limited. For a variety of reasons, energies on the order of 15 keV are used. This corresponds to the average kinetic energy at a temperature of approximately 174 million Kelvin, a typical magnetic confinement fusion plasma temperature.

The problem with this colliding beam fusion approach, in general, is that the ions will most likely never hit each other no matter how precisely aimed. Even the most minor misalignment will cause the particles to scatter and thus fail to fuse. It is simple to demonstrate that the scattering chance is many orders of magnitude higher than the fusion rate, meaning that the vast majority of the energy supplied to the ions will go to waste and those fusion reactions that do occur cannot make up for these losses. To be energy positive, a fusion device must recycle these ions back into the fuel mass so that they have thousands or millions of such chances to fuse, and their energy must be retained as much as possible during this period.

The fusor attempts to meet this requirement through the spherical arrangement of its accelerator grid system. Ions that fail to fuse pass through the center of the device and back into the accelerator on the far side, where they are accelerated back into the center again. There is no energy lost in this action, and in theory, assuming infinitely thin grid wires, the ions can circulate forever with no additional energy needed. Even those that scatter will simply take on a new trajectory, exit the grid at some new point, and accelerate back into the center again, providing the circulation that is required for a fusion event to eventually take place.

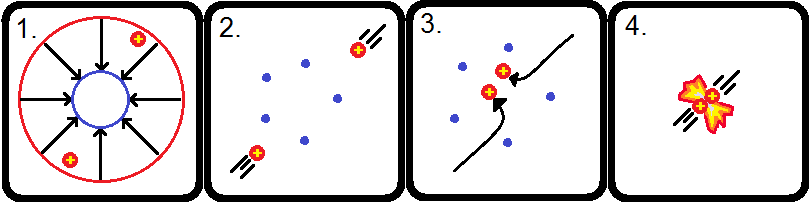
Basic mechanism of fusion in fusors. (1) The fusor contains two concentric wire cages: the cathode is inside the anode. (2) Positive ions are attracted to the inner cathode, they fall down the voltage drop and gain energy. (3) The ions miss the inner cage and enter the neutral reaction area. (4) The ions may collide in the center and may fuse.

=== Losses ===
It is important to consider the actual startup sequence of a fusor to understand the resulting operation. Normally the system is pumped down to a vacuum and then a small amount of gas is placed inside the vacuum chamber. This gas will spread out to fill the volume. When voltage is applied to the electrodes, the atoms between them will experience a field that will cause them to ionize and begin accelerating inward. As the atoms are randomly distributed to begin, the amount of energy they will gain differs; atoms initially near the anode will gain some large portion of the applied voltage, say 15 keV. Those initially near the cathode will gain much less energy, possibly far too low to undergo fusion with their counterparts on the far side of the central reaction area.

The fuel atoms inside the inner area during the startup period are not ionized. The accelerated ions scatter with these and lose their energy, while ionizing the formerly cold atom. This process, and the scatterings off other ions, causes the ion energies to become randomly distributed and the fuel rapidly takes on a non-thermal distribution. For this reason, the energy needed in a fusor system is higher than one where the fuel is heated by some other method, as some will be "lost" during startup.

Real electrodes are not infinitely thin, and the potential for scattering off the wires or even capture of the ions within the electrodes is a significant issue that causes high conduction losses. These losses can be at least five orders of magnitude higher than the energy released from the fusion reaction, even when the fusor is in star mode, which minimizes these reactions.

There are numerous other loss mechanisms as well. These include charge exchange between high-energy ions and low-energy neutral particles, which causes the ion to capture the electron, become electrically neutral, and then leave the fusor as it is no longer accelerated back into the chamber. This leaves behind a newly ionized atom of lower energy and thus cools the plasma. Scatterings may also increase the energy of an ion which allows it to move past the anode and escape, in this example anything above 15 keV.

Additionally, the scatterings of both the ions, and especially impurities left in the chamber, lead to significant Bremsstrahlung, creating X-rays that carries energy out of the fuel. This effect grows with particle energy, meaning the problem becomes more pronounced as the system approaches fusion-relevant operating conditions.

As a result of these loss mechanisms, no fusor has ever come close to break-even energy output and it appears it is unable to ever do so.

The common sources of the high voltage are ZVS flyback HV sources and neon-sign transformers. It can also be called an electrostatic particle accelerator.

== History ==
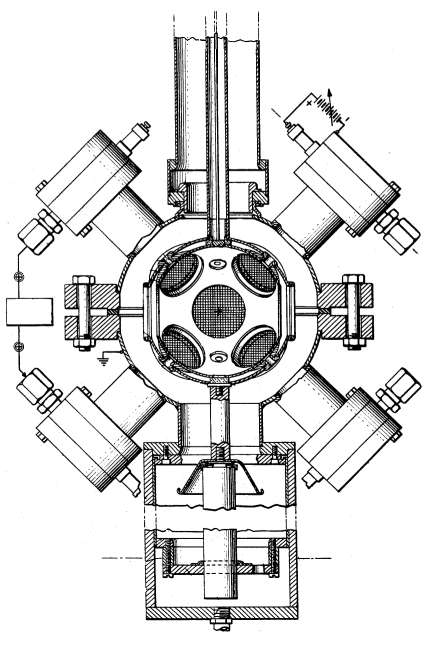
U.S. patent 3,386,883 – fusor – Image from Farnsworth's patent, on 4 June 1968. This device has an inner cage to make the field, and four ion guns on the outside.

The fusor was originally conceived by Philo T. Farnsworth, better known for his pioneering work in television. In the early 1930s, he investigated a number of vacuum tube designs for use in television, and found one that led to an interesting effect. In this design, which he called the "multipactor", electrons moving from one electrode to another were stopped in mid-flight with the proper application of a high-frequency magnetic field. The charge would then accumulate in the center of the tube, leading to high amplification. Unfortunately it also led to high erosion on the electrodes when the electrons eventually hit them, and today the multipactor effect is generally considered a problem to be avoided.

What particularly interested Farnsworth about the device was its ability to focus electrons at a particular point. One of the biggest problems in fusion research is to keep the hot fuel from hitting the walls of the container. If this is allowed to happen, the fuel cannot be kept hot enough for the fusion reaction to occur. Farnsworth reasoned that he could build an electrostatic plasma confinement system in which the "wall" fields of the reactor were electrons or ions being held in place by the multipactor. Fuel could then be injected through the wall, and once inside it would be unable to escape. He called this concept a virtual electrode, and the system as a whole the fusor.

=== Design ===
Farnsworth's original fusor designs were based on cylindrical arrangements of electrodes, like the original multipactors. Fuel was ionized and then fired from small accelerators through holes in the outer (physical) electrodes. Once through the hole they were accelerated towards the inner reaction area at high velocity. Electrostatic pressure from the positively charged electrodes would keep the fuel as a whole off the walls of the chamber, and impacts from new ions would keep the hottest plasma in the center. He referred to this as inertial electrostatic confinement, a term that continues to be used to this day. The voltage between the electrodes needs to be at least 25 kV for fusion to occur.

=== Work at Farnsworth Television labs ===
All of this work had taken place at the Farnsworth Television labs, which had been purchased in 1949 by ITT Corporation, as part of its plan to become the next RCA, and had been spearheaded by Farnsworth. However, a fusion research project was not regarded as immediately profitable. In 1965, the board of directors started asking Harold Geneen to sell off the Farnsworth division, but he had his 1966 budget approved with funding until the middle of 1967. Further funding was refused, and Farnsworth became ill and entered medical retirement, which ended ITT's experiments with fusion.

Things changed dramatically with the arrival of Robert Hirsch, and the introduction of the modified Hirsch–Meeks fusor patent. New fusors based on Hirsch's design were first constructed between 1964 and 1967. Hirsch published his design in a paper in 1967. His design included ion beams to shoot ions into the vacuum chamber.

The team then turned to the AEC, then in charge of fusion research funding, and provided them with a demonstration device mounted on a serving cart that produced more fusion than any existing "classical" device. The observers were startled, but the timing was bad; Hirsch himself had recently revealed the great progress being made by the Soviets using the tokamak. In response to this surprising development, the AEC decided to concentrate funding on large tokamak projects, and reduce backing for alternative concepts.

=== Recent developments ===
George H. Miley at the University of Illinois reexamined the fusor and re-introduced it into the field. A low but steady interest in the fusor has persisted since. An important development was the successful commercial introduction of a fusor-based neutron generator. From 2006 until his death in 2007, Robert W. Bussard gave talks on a reactor similar in design to the fusor, now called the polywell, that he stated would be capable of useful power generation. Most recently, the fusor has gained popularity among amateurs, who choose them as home projects due to their relatively low space, money, and power requirements. An online community of "fusioneers", The Open Source Fusor Research Consortium, or Fusor.net, is dedicated to reporting developments in the world of fusors and aiding other amateurs in their projects. The site includes forums, articles and papers done on the fusor, including Farnsworth's original patent, as well as Hirsch's patent of his version of the invention.

== Fusion in fusors ==
=== Basic fusion ===
The cross-sections of different fusion reactions

Nuclear fusion refers to reactions in which lighter nuclei are combined to become heavier nuclei. This process changes mass into energy which in turn may be captured to provide fusion power. Many types of atoms can be fused. The easiest to fuse are deuterium and tritium. For fusion to occur the ions must be at a temperature of at least 4 keV (kiloelectronvolts), or about 45 million kelvins. The second easiest reaction is fusing deuterium with itself. Because this gas is cheaper, it is the fuel commonly used by amateurs. The ease of doing a fusion reaction is measured by its cross section.

=== Net power ===
At such conditions, the atoms are ionized and make a plasma. The energy generated by fusion, inside a hot plasma cloud can be found with the following equation.

$$P_\text{fusion} = n_A n_B \langle \sigma v_{A,B} \rangle E_\text{fusion},$$

where

$P_\text{fusion}$ is the fusion power density (energy per time per volume),
n is the number density of species A or B (particles per volume),
$\langle \sigma v_{A,B} \rangle$ is the product of the collision cross-section σ (which depends on the relative velocity) and the relative velocity v of the two species, averaged over all the particle velocities in the system,
$E_\text{fusion}$ is the energy released by a single fusion reaction.

This equation shows that energy varies with the temperature, density, speed of collision, and fuel used. To reach net power, fusion reactions have to occur fast enough to make up for energy losses. Any power plant using fusion will hold in this hot cloud. Plasma clouds lose energy through conduction and radiation. Conduction is when ions, electrons or neutrals touch a surface and leak out. Energy is lost with the particle. Radiation is when energy leaves the cloud as light. Radiation increases as the temperature rises. To get net power from fusion it's necessary to overcome these losses. This leads to an equation for power output.

$$P_\text{out} = \eta_\text{capture} (P_\text{fusion} - P_\text{conduction} - P_\text{radiation}).$$

where:

η is the efficiency,
$P_\text{conduction}$ is the power of conduction losses as energy-laden mass leaves,
$P_\text{radiation}$ is the power of radiation losses as energy leaves as light,
$P_\text{out}$ is the net power from fusion.

John Lawson used this equation to estimate some conditions for net power based on a Maxwellian cloud. This became the Lawson criterion. Fusors typically suffer from conduction losses due to the wire cage being in the path of the recirculating plasma.

=== In fusors ===
In the original fusor design, several small particle accelerators, essentially TV tubes with the ends removed, inject ions at a relatively low voltage into a vacuum chamber. In the Hirsch version of the fusor, the ions are produced by ionizing a dilute gas in the chamber. In either version there are two concentric spherical electrodes, the inner one being charged negatively with respect to the outer one (to about 80 kV). Once the ions enter the region between the electrodes, they are accelerated towards the center.

In the fusor, the ions are accelerated to several keV by the electrodes, so heating as such is not necessary (as long as the ions fuse before losing their energy by any process). Whereas 45 megakelvins is a very high temperature by any standard, the corresponding voltage is only 4 kV, a level commonly found in such devices as neon signs and CRT televisions. To the extent that the ions remain at their initial energy, the energy can be tuned to take advantage of the peak of the reaction cross section or to avoid disadvantageous (for example neutron-producing) reactions that might occur at higher energies.

Various attempts have been made at increasing deuterium ionization rate, including heaters within "ion-guns", (similar to the "electron gun" which forms the basis for old-style television display tubes), as well as magnetron type devices, (which are the power sources for microwave ovens), which can enhance ion formation using high-voltage electromagnetic fields. Any method which increases ion density (within limits which preserve ion mean-free path), or ion energy, can be expected to enhance the fusion yield, typically measured in the number of neutrons produced per second.

The ease with which the ion energy can be increased appears to be particularly useful when "high temperature" fusion reactions are considered, such as proton-boron fusion, which has plentiful fuel, requires no radioactive tritium, and produces no neutrons in the primary reaction.

== Common considerations ==
=== Modes of operation ===
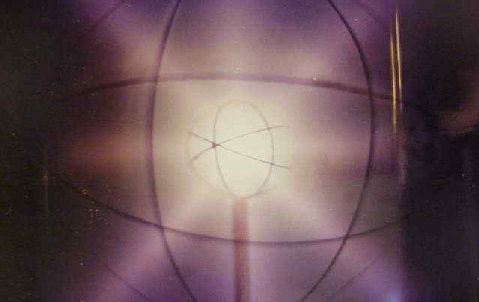
Farnsworth–Hirsch fusor during operation in so called "star mode" characterized by "rays" of glowing plasma which appear to emanate from the gaps in the inner grid.

Fusors have at least two modes of operation (possibly more): star mode and halo mode. Halo mode is characterized by a broad symmetric glow, with one or two electron beams exiting the structure. There is little fusion. The halo mode occurs in higher pressure tanks, and as the vacuum improves, the device transitions to star mode. Star mode appears as bright beams of light emanating from the device center.

=== Power density ===
Because the electric field made by the cages is negative, it cannot simultaneously trap both positively charged ions and negative electrons. Hence, there must be some regions of charge accumulation, which will result in an upper limit on the achievable density. This could place an upper limit on the machine's power density, which may keep it too low for power production.

=== Thermalization of the ion velocities ===
When they first fall into the center of the fusor, the ions will all have the same energy, but the velocity distribution will rapidly approach a Maxwell–Boltzmann distribution. This would occur through simple Coulomb collisions in a matter of milliseconds, but beam-beam instabilities will occur orders of magnitude faster still. In comparison, any given ion will require a few minutes before undergoing a fusion reaction, so that the monoenergetic picture of the fusor, at least for power production, is not appropriate. One consequence of the thermalization is that some of the ions will gain enough energy to leave the potential well, taking their energy with them, without having undergone a fusion reaction.

=== Electrodes ===
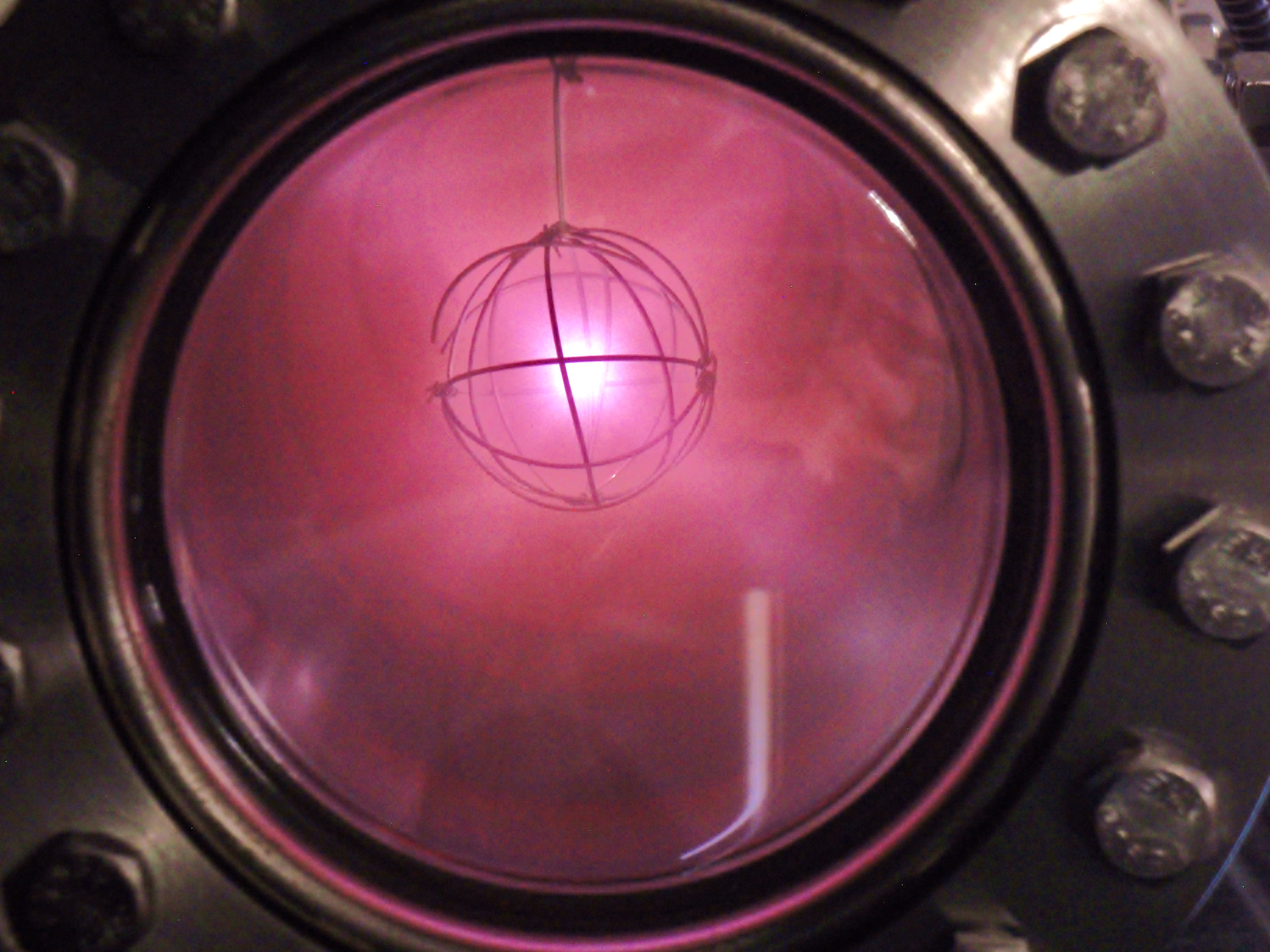
Image showing a different grid design.

There are a number of unsolved challenges with the electrodes in a fusor power system. To begin with, the electrodes cannot influence the potential within themselves, so it would seem at first glance that the fusion plasma would be in more or less direct contact with the inner electrode, resulting in contamination of the plasma and destruction of the electrode. However, the majority of the fusion tends to occur in microchannels formed in areas of minimum electric potential, seen as visible "rays" penetrating the core. These form because the forces within the region correspond to roughly stable "orbits". Approximately 40% of the high energy ions in a typical grid operating in star mode may be within these microchannels. Nonetheless, grid collisions remain the primary energy loss mechanism for Farnsworth–Hirsch fusors. Complicating issues is the challenge in cooling the central electrode; any fusor producing enough power to run a power plant seems destined to also destroy its inner electrode. As one fundamental limitation, any method which produces a neutron flux that is captured to heat a working fluid will also bombard its electrodes with that flux, heating them as well.

Attempts to resolve these problems include Bussard's Polywell system, D. C. Barnes' modified Penning trap approach, and the University of Illinois's fusor which retains grids but attempts to more tightly focus the ions into microchannels to attempt to avoid losses. While all three are Inertial electrostatic confinement (IEC) devices, only the last is actually a "fusor".

=== Radiation ===
Charged particles will radiate energy as light when they change velocity. This loss rate can be estimated for nonrelativistic particles using the Larmor formula. Inside a fusor there is a cloud of ions and electrons. These particles will accelerate or decelerate as they move about. These changes in speed make the cloud lose energy as light. The radiation from a fusor can (at least) be in the visible, ultraviolet and X-ray spectrum, depending on the type of fusor used. These changes in speed can be due to electrostatic interactions between particles (ion to ion, ion to electron, electron to electron). This is referred to bremsstrahlung radiation, and is common in fusors. Changes in speed can also be due to interactions between the particle and the electric field. Since there are no magnetic fields, fusors emit no cyclotron radiation at slow speeds, or synchrotron radiation at high speeds.

In Fundamental limitations on plasma fusion systems not in thermodynamic equilibrium, Todd Rider argues that a quasineutral isotropic plasma will lose energy due to Bremsstrahlung at a rate prohibitive for any fuel other than D-T (or possibly D-D or D-He3). This paper is not applicable to IEC fusion, as a quasineutral plasma cannot be contained by an electric field, which is a fundamental part of IEC fusion. However, in an earlier paper, "A general critique of inertial-electrostatic confinement fusion systems", Rider addresses the common IEC devices directly, including the fusor. In the case of the fusor the electrons are generally separated from the mass of the fuel isolated near the electrodes, which limits the loss rate. However, Rider demonstrates that practical fusors operate in a range of modes that either lead to significant electron mixing and losses, or alternately lower power densities. This appears to be a sort of catch-22 that limits the output of any fusor-like system.

=== Safety ===
There are several key safety considerations involved with the building and operation of a fusor. First, there is the high-voltage involved. Second, there are the x-ray and neutron emissions that are possible. Also there are the publicity / misinformation considerations with local and regulatory authorities.

== Commercial applications ==
Production source	Neutrons
Energy	2.45 MeV
Mass	940 MeV
Electric charge	0 C
Spin	1/2

=== Neutron source ===
The fusor has been demonstrated as a viable neutron source. Typical fusors cannot reach fluxes as high as nuclear reactor or particle accelerator sources, but are sufficient for many uses. Importantly, the neutron generator easily sits on a benchtop, and can be turned off at the flick of a switch. A commercial fusor was developed as a non-core business within DaimlerChrysler Aerospace – Space Infrastructure, Bremen between 1996 and early 2001. After the project was effectively ended, the former project manager established a company which is called NSD-Fusion. To date, the highest neutron flux achieved by a fusor-like device has been 3 × 10^{11} neutrons per second with the deuterium-deuterium fusion reaction.

=== Medical isotopes ===
Commercial startups have used the neutron fluxes generated by fusors to generate Mo-99, a precursor to Technetium-99m, an isotope used for medical care.

== Patents ==
- Bennett, W. H., U.S. patent 3,120,475, February 1964. (Thermonuclear power).
- P. T. Farnsworth, U.S. patent 3,258,402, June 1966 (Electric discharge — Nuclear interaction).
- P. T. Farnsworth, U.S. patent 3,386,883. June 1968 (Method and apparatus).
- Hirsch, Robert, U.S. patent 3,530,036. September 1970 (Apparatus).
- Hirsch, Robert, U.S. patent 3,530,497. September 1970 (Generating apparatus — Hirsch/Meeks).
- Hirsch, Robert, U.S. patent 3,533,910. October 1970 (Lithium-Ion source).
- Hirsch, Robert, U.S. patent 3,655,508. April 1972 (Reduce plasma leakage).
- P. T. Farnsworth, U.S. patent 3,664,920. May 1972 (Electrostatic containment).
- R. W. Bussard, "Method and apparatus for controlling charged particles", U.S. patent 4,826,646, May 1989 (Method and apparatus — Magnetic grid fields).
- R. W. Bussard, "Method and apparatus for creating and controlling nuclear fusion reactions", U.S. patent 5,160,695, November 1992 (Method and apparatus — Ion acoustic waves).

== See also ==
- Coulomb barrier
- Helium-3 – possible fuel
- List of fusor examples
- Polywell
