= Startup neutron source =

Neutron source used to start nuclear reactors

A startup neutron source is a neutron source used for stable and reliable initiation of nuclear chain reaction in nuclear reactors, when they are loaded with fresh nuclear fuel, whose neutron flux from spontaneous fission is insufficient for a reliable startup, or after prolonged shutdown periods. Neutron sources ensure a constant minimal population of neutrons in the reactor core, sufficient for a smooth startup. Without them, the reactor could suffer fast power excursions during startup from state with too few self-generated neutrons (new core or after extended shutdown).

The startup sources are typically inserted in regularly spaced positions inside the reactor core, in place of some of the fuel rods.

The sources are important for safe reactor startup. The spontaneous fission and ambient radiation such as cosmic rays serve as weak neutron sources, but these are too weak for the reactor instrumentation to detect; relying on them could lead to a "blind" start, which is a potentially unsafe condition. Blind startups were used in the early days of the American nuclear submarine program, before corrosion problems of the cladding of startup sources were resolved. (Leaking of the first neutron sources contaminated the reactors, making maintenance dangerous.) The sources are positioned so that the neutron flux they produce is always detectable by the reactor monitoring instruments. When the reactor is in a shutdown state, the neutron sources serve to provide signals for neutron detectors monitoring the reactor, to ensure the detectors are operable. The equilibrium level of neutron flux in a subcritical reactor is dependent on the neutron source strength; a certain minimum level of source activity has to be ensured in order to maintain control over the reactor when in strongly subcritical state, namely during startups.

The sources can be of two types:

- Primary sources, used for startup of a fresh reactor core; conventional neutron sources are used. The primary sources are removed from the reactor after the first fuel campaign, usually after a few months, as neutron capture resulting from the thermal neutron flux in an operating reactor changes the composition of the isotopes used, reducing their useful lifetime as neutron sources.
  - Californium-252 (spontaneous fission)
  - Plutonium-238 & beryllium, (α,n) reaction
  - americium-241 & beryllium, (α,n) reaction
  - polonium-210 & beryllium, (α,n) reaction
  - radium-226 & beryllium, (α,n) reaction

When plutonium-238/beryllium primary sources are utilized, they can be either affixed to control rods which are removed from the reactor when it is powered, or clad in a cadmium alloy, which is opaque to thermal neutrons (reducing transmutation of the plutonium-238 by neutron capture) but transparent to fast neutrons produced by the source.

- Secondary sources, originally inert, become radioactive and neutron-producing only after neutron activation in the reactor. Due to this, they tend to be less expensive. Exposure to thermal neutrons also serves to maintain the source activity (the radioactive isotopes are both burned and generated in neutron flux).
  - Sb-Be photoneutron source; antimony becomes radioactive in the reactor and its strong gamma emissions (1.7 MeV for ^{124}Sb) interact with beryllium-9 by an (γ,n) reaction and provide photoneutrons. In a PWR reactor one neutron source rod contains 160 grams of antimony, and stays in the reactor for 5–7 years. The sources are often constructed as an antimony rod surrounded by beryllium layer and clad in stainless steel. Antimony-beryllium alloy can be also used.

The chain reaction in the first critical reactor, CP-1, was initiated by a radium-beryllium neutron source. Similarly, in modern reactors (after startup), delayed neutron emission from fission products suffices to sustain the amplification reaction while yielding controllable growth times. In comparison, a bomb is based on immediate neutrons and grows exponentially in nanoseconds.
