= Polywell =

Fusion reactor design

The polywell is a proposed design for a fusion reactor using an electric and magnetic field to heat ions to fusion conditions.

The design is related to the fusor, the high beta fusion reactor, the magnetic mirror, and the biconic cusp. A set of electromagnets generates a magnetic field that traps electrons. This creates a negative voltage, which attracts positive ions. As the ions accelerate towards the negative center, their kinetic energy rises. Ions that collide at high enough energies can fuse.

== Mechanism ==
=== Fusor heating ===
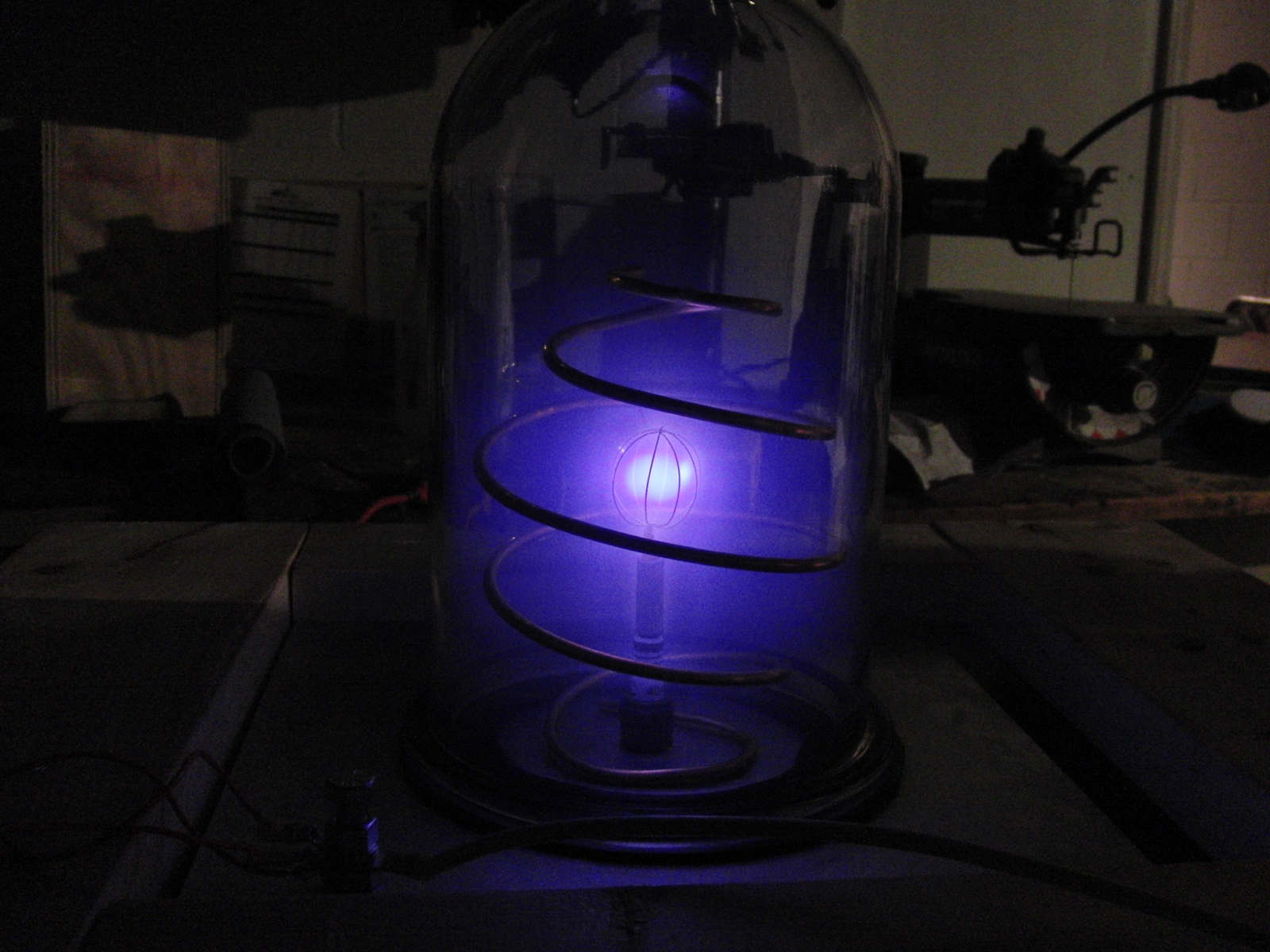
A homemade fusor

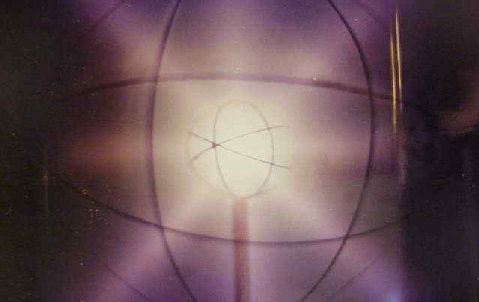
A Farnsworth–Hirsch fusor during operation in star mode, characterized by "rays" of glowing plasma which appear to emanate from the gaps in the inner grid

A Farnsworth-Hirsch fusor consists of two wire cages, one inside the other, often referred to as grids, that are placed inside a vacuum chamber. The outer cage has a positive voltage relative to the inner cage. A fuel, typically, deuterium gas, is injected into this chamber. It is heated past its ionization temperature, making positive ions. The ions are positive and move towards the negative inner cage. Those that miss the wires of the inner cage fly through the center of the device at high speeds and can fly out the other side of the inner cage. As the ions move outward, a Coulomb force impels them back towards the center. Over time, a core of ionized gas can form inside the inner cage. Ions pass back and forth through the core until they strike either the grid or another nucleus. Most nucleus strikes do not result in fusion. Grid strikes can raise the temperature of the grid as well as eroding it. These strikes conduct mass and energy away from the plasma, as well as spall off metal ions into the gas, which cools it.

In fusors, the potential well is made with a wire cage. Because most of the ions and electrons fall onto the cage, fusors suffer from high conduction losses. Hence, no fusor has come close to energy break-even.

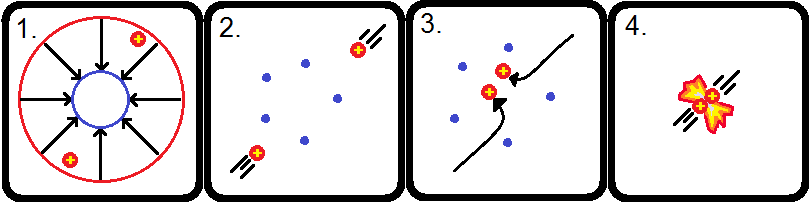
Figure 1: Illustration of the basic mechanism of fusion in fusors. (1) The fusor contains two concentric wire cages. The cathode (blue) is inside the anode (red). (2) Positive ions are attracted to the inner cathode. The electric field does work on the ions heating them to fusion conditions. (3) The ions miss the inner cage. (4) The ions collide in the center and may fuse.

=== Diamagnetic plasma trapping ===
The Polywell is attempting to hold a diamagnetic plasma - a material which rejects the outside magnetic fields created by the electromagnets.

- Most plasma in most fusion reactors (such as Magnetic mirrors, tokamaks and Stellarators) are considered magnetized. A Magnetized plasma occurs when the external field is so strong that it completely penetrates and controls the plasma, such that the material behavior is dominated by the external field.
- Some fusion plasmas are self-magnetized (such as field-reversed configurations, or Dynomaks) all of which can create their own weak magnetic fields through the formation of loops of plasma currents and other structures.

Both the Polywell and the high beta fusion reactor pre-suppose that the plasma self-generated field is so strong that it will reject the outside field. Bussard later called this type of confinement the Wiffle-Ball. This analogy was used to describe electron trapping inside the field. Marbles can be trapped inside a Wiffle ball, a hollow, perforated sphere; if marbles are put inside, they can roll and sometimes escape through the holes in the sphere. The magnetic topology of a high-beta polywell acts similarly with electrons. In June 2014 EMC2 published a preprint providing (1) x-ray and (2) flux loop measurements that the diamagnetic effect will impact the external field.

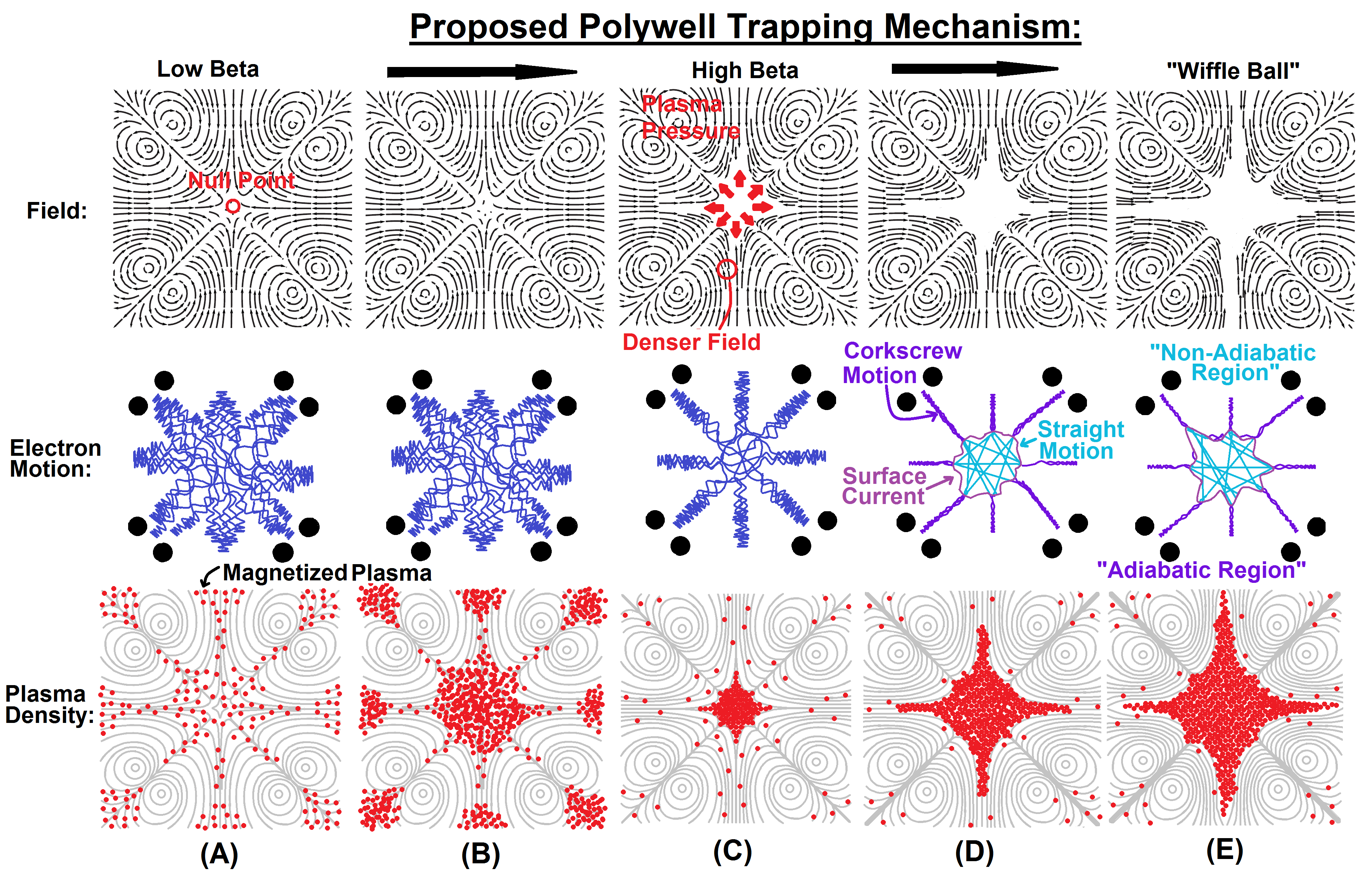
This figure shows the development of the proposed "wiffle ball" confinement concept. Three rows of figures are shown: the magnetic field, the electron motion and the plasma density inside the polywell. (A) The field is the superposition of six rings in a box. In the center is a null point - a zone of no magnetic field. The plasma is magnetized, meaning that the plasma and magnetic field intermix. (B) As plasma is injected, the density rises. (C) As the plasma density rises, the plasma becomes more diamagnetic, causing it to reject the outside magnetic field. As the plasma presses outwards, the density of the surrounding magnetic field rises. This tightens the corkscrewing motion of the particles outsides the center. A sharp boundary is formed. A current is predicted to form on this boundary. (D) If the pressures find equilibrium at a beta of one, this determines the shape of the plasma cloud. (E) In the center, there is no magnetic field from the rings. This means that its motion inside the field free radius should be relatively straight or ballistic.

According to Bussard, typical cusp leakage rate is such that an electron makes 5 to 8 passes before escaping through a cusp in a standard mirror confinement biconic cusp; 10 to 60 passes in a polywell under mirror confinement (low beta) that he called cusp confinement; and several thousand passes in Wiffle-Ball confinement (high beta).

In February 2013, Lockheed Martin Skunk Works announced a new compact fusion machine, the high beta fusion reactor, that may be related to the biconic cusp and the polywell, and working at β = 1.

== Other trapping mechanisms ==
=== Magnetic mirror ===
Magnetic mirror dominates in low beta designs. Both ions and electrons are reflected from high to low density fields. This is known as the magnetic mirror effect. The polywell's rings are arranged so the densest fields are on the outside, trapping electrons in the center. This can trap particles at low beta values.

=== Cusp confinement ===
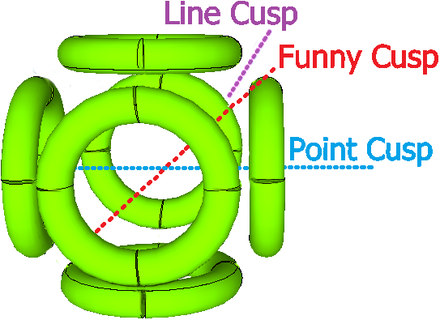
Figure 3: Polywell cusps. The line cusp runs along the seam between two electromagnets. The funny cusp is the cusp between three magnets, running along the corners. The point cusp lies in the middle of one electromagnet.

In high beta conditions, the machine may operate with cusp confinement. This is an improvement over the simpler magnetic mirror. The MaGrid has six point cusps, each located in the middle of a ring; and two highly modified line cusps, linking the eight corner cusps located at cube vertices. The key is that these two line cusps are much narrower than the single line cusp in magnetic mirror machines, so the net losses are less. The two line cusps losses are similar to or lower than the six face-centered point cusps. In 1955, Harold Grad theorized that a high-beta plasma pressure combined with a cusped magnetic field would improve plasma confinement. A diamagnetic plasma rejects the external fields and plugs the cusps. This system would be a much better trap.

Cusped confinement was explored theoretically and experimentally. However, most cusped experiments failed and disappeared from national programs by 1980.

=== Beta in magnetic traps ===
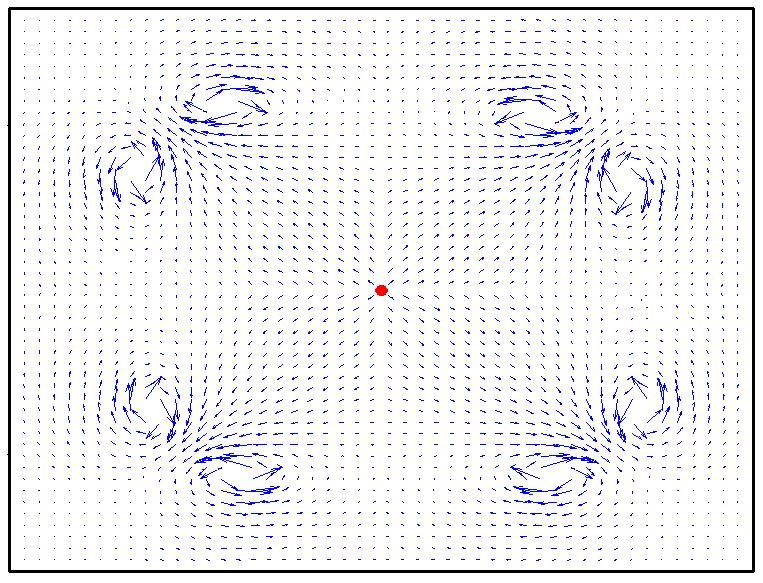
Figure 2: A plot of the magnetic field generated by the MaGrid inside a polywell. The null point is marked in red in the center.

Magnetic fields exert a pressure on the plasma. Beta is the ratio of plasma pressure to the magnetic field strength. It can be defined separately for electrons and ions. The polywell concerns itself only for the electron beta, whereas the ion beta is of greater interest within Tokamak and other neutral-plasma machines. The two vary by a very large ratio, because of the enormous difference in mass between an electron and any ion. Typically, in other devices the electron beta is neglected, as the ion beta determines more important plasma parameters. This is a significant point of confusion for scientists more familiar with more 'conventional' fusion plasma physics.

Note that for the electron beta, only the electron number density and temperature are used, as both of these, but especially the latter, can vary significantly from the ion parameters at the same location.

$$\beta_e = \frac{p}{p_{mag}} = \frac{n_e k_B T_e}{(B^2/2\mu_0)}$$

Most experiments on polywells involve low-beta plasma regimes (where β < 1), where the plasma pressure is weak compared to the magnetic pressure. Several models describe magnetic trapping in polywells. Tests indicated that plasma confinement is enhanced in a magnetic cusp configuration when β (plasma pressure/magnetic field pressure) is of order unity. This enhancement is required for a fusion power reactor based on cusp confinement to be feasible.

== Design ==
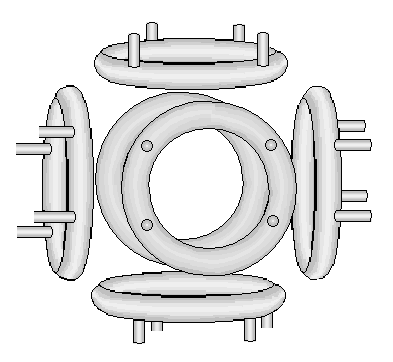
Figure 1: Sketch of a MaGrid in a polywell

The main problem with the fusor is that the inner cage conducts away too much energy and mass. The solution, suggested by Robert Bussard and Oleg Lavrentiev, was to replace the negative cage with a "virtual cathode" made of a cloud of electrons.

A polywell consists of several parts. These are put inside a vacuum chamber

- A set of positively charged electromagnet coils arranged in a polyhedron. The most common arrangement is a six sided cube. The six magnetic poles are pointing in the same direction toward the center. The magnetic field vanishes at the center by symmetry, creating a null point.
- Electron guns facing ring axis. These shoot electrons into the center of the ring structure. Once inside, the electrons are confined by the magnetic fields. This has been measured in polywells using Langmuir probes. Electrons that have enough energy to escape through the magnetic cusps can be re-attracted to the positive rings. They can slow down and return to the inside of the rings along the cusps. This reduces conduction losses, and improves the overall performance of the machine. The electrons act as a negative voltage drop attracting positive ions. This is a virtual cathode.
- Gas puffers at corner. Gas is puffed inside the rings where it ionizes at the electron cloud. As ions fall down the potential well, the electric field works on them, heating it to fusion conditions. The ions build up speed. They can slam together in the center and fuse. Ions are electrostatically confined raising the density and increasing the fusion rate.

The magnetic energy density required to confine electrons is far smaller than that required to directly confine ions, as is done in other fusion projects such as ITER.

== Other behavior ==
=== Single-electron motion ===
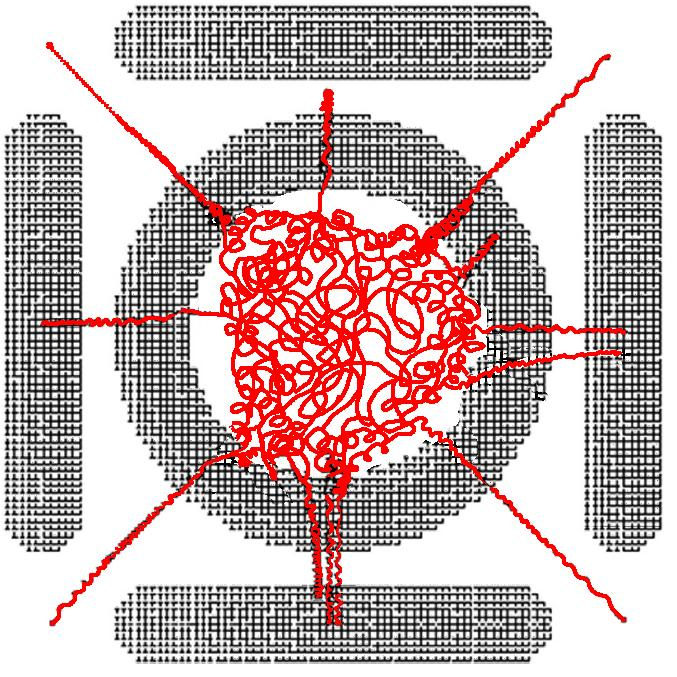
Figure 4: Illustration of single electron motion inside the polywell. It is based on figures from "Low beta confinement in a polywell modeled with conventional point cusp theories" but is not an exact copy.

As an electron enters a magnetic field, it feels a Lorentz force and corkscrews. The radius of this motion is the gyroradius. As it moves it loses some energy as x-rays, every time it changes speed. The electron spins faster and tighter in denser fields, as it enters the MaGrid. Inside the MaGrid, single electrons travel straight through the null point, due to their infinite gyroradius in regions of no magnetic field. Next, they head towards the edges of the MaGrid field and corkscrew tighter along the denser magnetic field lines. This is typical electron cyclotron resonance motion. Their gyroradius shrinks and when they hit a dense magnetic field they can be reflected using the magnetic mirror effect. Electron trapping has been measured in polywells with Langmuir probes.

The polywell attempts to confine the ions and electrons through two different means, borrowed from fusors and magnetic mirrors. The electrons are easier to confine magnetically because they have so much less mass than the ions. The machine confines ions using an electric field in the same way a fusor confines the ions: in the polywell, the ions are attracted to the negative electron cloud in the center. In the fusor, they are attracted to a negative wire cage in the center.

=== Plasma recirculation ===
Plasma recirculation would significantly improve the function of these machines. It has been argued that efficient recirculation is the only way they can be viable. Electrons or ions move through the device without striking a surface, reducing conduction losses. Bussard stressed this; specifically emphasizing that electrons need to move through all cusps of the machine.

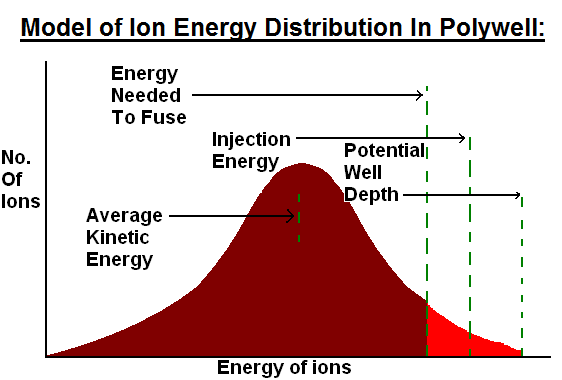
Figure 5: Thermalized plasma ion energy distribution inside a polywell. This model assumes a maxwellian ion population, broken into different groups. (1) The ions which do not have enough energy to fuse, (2) the ions at the injection energy (3) the ions that have so much kinetic energy that they escape.

=== Models of energy distribution ===
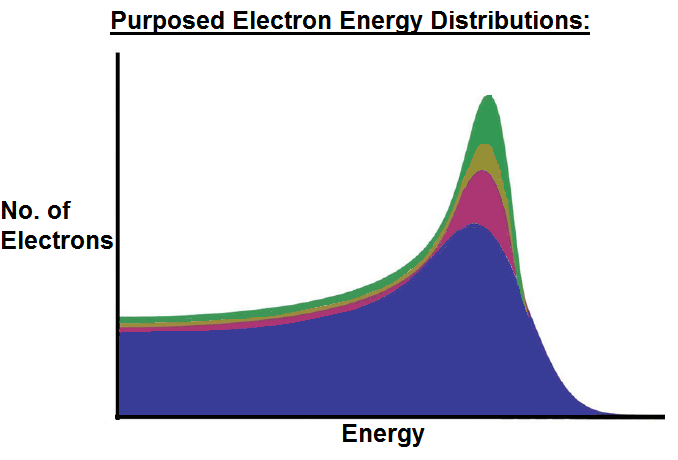
Figure 6: Non-thermalized plasma energy distribution inside a polywell. It is argued that the region of unmagnetized space leads to electron scattering, this leads to a monoenergetic distribution with a cold electron tail. This is supported by 2 dimensional particle-in-cell simulations.

As of 2015 it had not been determined conclusively what the ion or electron energy distribution is. The energy distribution of the plasma can be measured using a Langmuir probe. This probe absorbs charge from the plasma as its voltage changes, making an I-V Curve. From this signal, the energy distribution can be calculated. The energy distribution both drives and is driven by several physical rates, the electron and ion loss rate, the rate of energy loss by radiation, the fusion rate and the rate of non-fusion collisions. The collision rate may vary greatly across the system:

- At the edge: where ions are slow and the electrons are fast.
- At the center: where ions are fast and electrons are slow.

Critics claimed that both the electrons and ion populations have bell curve distribution; that the plasma is thermalized. The justification given is that the longer the electrons and ions move inside the polywell, the more interactions they undergo leading to thermalization. This model for the ion distribution is shown in Figure 5.

Supporters modeled a nonthermal plasma. The justification is the high amount of scattering in the device center. Without a magnetic field, electrons scatter in this region. They claimed that this scattering leads to a monoenergetic distribution, like the one shown in Figure 6. This argument is supported by 2 dimensional particle-in-cell simulations. Bussard argued that constant electron injection would have the same effect. Such a distribution would help maintain a negative voltage in the center, improving performance.

== Considerations for net power ==
=== Fuel type ===
Figure 7: Plot of the cross section of different fusion reactions.

Nuclear fusion refers to nuclear reactions that combine lighter nuclei to become heavier nuclei. All chemical elements can be fused; for elements with fewer protons than iron, this process changes mass into energy that can potentially be captured to provide fusion power.

The probability of a fusion reaction occurring is controlled by the cross section of the fuel, which is in turn a function of its temperature. The easiest nuclei to fuse are deuterium and tritium. Their fusion occurs when the ions reach 4 keV (kiloelectronvolts), or about 45 million kelvins. The Polywell would achieve this by accelerating an ion with a charge of 1 down a 4,000 volt electric field. The high cost, short half-life and radioactivity of tritium make it difficult to work with.

The second easiest reaction is to fuse deuterium with itself. Because of its low cost, deuterium is commonly used by Fusor amateurs. Bussard's polywell experiments were performed using this fuel. Fusion of deuterium or tritium produces a fast neutron, and therefore produces radioactive waste. Bussard's choice was to fuse boron-11 with protons; this reaction is aneutronic (does not produce neutrons). An advantage of p-^{11}B as a fusion fuel is that the primary reactor output would be energetic alpha particles, which can be directly converted to electricity at high efficiency using direct energy conversion. Direct conversion has achieved a 48% power efficiency against 80–90% theoretical efficiency.

=== Lawson criterion ===
The energy generated by fusion inside a hot plasma cloud can be found with the following equation:

$$P_\text{fusion} = n_A n_B \langle \sigma v_{A,B} \rangle E_\text{fusion}$$

where:

- $P_\text{fusion}$ is the fusion power density (energy per time per volume),
- n is the number density of species A or B (particles per volume),
- $\langle \sigma v_{A,B} \rangle$ is the product of the collision cross-section σ (which depends on the relative velocity) and the relative velocity of the two species v, averaged over all the particle velocities in the system.

Energy varies with temperature, density, collision speed and fuel. To reach net power production, reactions must occur rapidly enough to make up for energy losses. Plasma clouds lose energy through conduction and radiation. Conduction is when ions, electrons or neutrals touch a surface and escape. Energy is lost with the particle. Radiation is when energy escapes as light. Radiation increases with temperature. To get net power from fusion, these losses must be overcome. This leads to an equation for power output:

Net power = efficiency × (fusion − radiation loss − conduction loss)
- Net power – power output
- Efficiency – fraction of energy needed to drive the device and convert it to electricity.
- Fusion – energy generated by the fusion reactions.
- Radiation – energy lost as light, leaving the plasma.
- Conduction – energy lost, as mass leaves the plasma.

Lawson used this equation to estimate conditions for net power based on a Maxwellian cloud.

However, the Lawson criterion does not apply for Polywells if Bussard's conjecture that the plasma is nonthermal is correct. Lawson stated in his founding report: "It is of course easy to postulate systems in which the velocity distribution of the particle is not Maxwellian. These systems are outside the scope of this report." He also ruled out the possibility of a nonthermal plasma to ignite: "Nothing may be gained by using a system in which electrons are at a lower temperature [than ions]. The energy loss in such a system by transfer to the electrons will always be greater than the energy which would be radiated by the electrons if they were the [same] temperature."

== Criticism ==
There are several general criticisms of the Polywell:

- The heating mechanism breaks the quasi-neutral assumption. It is not easy or possible to concentrate negative charge robustly or for any long period.
- The plasma does not behave diamagnetically as presupposed. This challenges the basic trapping effect.
- Without a solid heating method, the plasma loses huge amounts of energy to radiation, becoming too cold to fuse (see Rider work below).
- With ions flying in from all directions, there is a buildup in angular momentum, leading to lots of ions being scattered out of the trap (see Nevins' work below).

=== Rider critique ===
Todd Rider (a biological engineer and former student of plasma physics) calculated that X-ray radiation losses with this fuel would exceed fusion power production by at least 20%. Rider's model used the following assumptions:

- The plasma was quasineutral. Therefore, positives and negatives equally mixed together.
- The fuel was evenly mixed throughout the volume.
- The plasma was isotropic, meaning that its behavior was the same in any given direction.
- The plasma had a uniform energy and temperature throughout the cloud.
- The plasma was an unstructured Gaussian sphere, with a strongly converged core that represented a small (~1%) part of the total volume. Nevins challenged this assumption, stating that the particles would build up angular momentum, causing the dense core to degrade. The loss of density inside the core would reduce fusion rates.
- The potential well was broad and flat.

Based on these assumptions, Rider used general equations to estimate the rates of different physical effects. These included the loss of ions to up-scattering, the ion thermalization rate, the energy loss due to X-ray radiation and the fusion rate. His conclusions were that the device suffered from "fundamental flaws".

By contrast, Bussard argued that the plasma had a different structure, temperature distribution and well profile. These characteristics have not been fully measured and are central to the device's feasibility. Bussard's calculations indicated that the bremsstrahlung losses would be much smaller. According to Bussard the high speed and therefore low cross section for Coulomb collisions of the ions in the core makes thermalizing collisions very unlikely, while the low speed at the rim means that thermalization there has almost no impact on ion velocity in the core. Bussard calculated that a polywell reactor with a radius of 1.5 meters would produce net power fusing deuterium.

Other studies disproved some of the assumptions made by Rider and Nevins, arguing the real fusion rate and the associated recirculating power (needed to overcome the thermalizing effect and sustain the non-Maxwellian ion profile) could be estimated only with a self-consistent collisional treatment of the ion distribution function, lacking in Rider's work.

=== Energy capture ===
It has been proposed that energy may be extracted from polywells using heat capture or, in the case of aneutronic fusion like D-^{3}He or p-^{11}B, direct energy conversion, though that scheme faces challenges. The energetic alpha particles (up to a few MeV) generated by the aneutronic fusion reaction would exit the MaGrid through the six axial cusps as cones (spread ion beams). Direct conversion collectors inside the vacuum chamber would convert the alpha particles' kinetic energy to a high-voltage direct current. The alpha particles must slow down before they contact the collector plates to realize high conversion efficiency. In experiments, direct conversion has demonstrated a conversion efficiency of 48%.

== History ==
In the late 1960s several investigations studied polyhedral magnetic fields as a possibility to confine a fusion plasma. The first proposal to combine this configuration with an electrostatic potential well in order to improve electron confinement was made by Oleg Lavrentiev in 1975. The idea was picked up by Robert Bussard in 1983. His 1989 patent application cited Lavrentiev, although in 2006 he appears to claim to have (re)discovered the idea independently.

=== HEPS ===
Research was funded first by the Defense Threat Reduction Agency beginning in 1987 and later by DARPA. This funding resulted in a machine known as the high energy power source (HEPS) experiment. It was built by Directed Technologies Inc. This machine was a large (1.9 m across) machine, with the rings outside the vacuum chamber. This machine performed poorly because the magnetic fields sent electrons into the walls, driving up conduction losses. These losses were attributed to poor electron injection. The US Navy began providing low-level funding to the project in 1992. Krall published results in 1994.

Bussard, who had been an advocate for tokamak research, turned to advocate for this concept, so that the idea became associated with his name. In 1995 he sent a letter to the US Congress stating that he had only supported tokamaks in order to get fusion research sponsored by the government, but he now believed that there were better alternatives.

=== EMC2, Inc. ===
Energy Matter Conversion Corporation (EMC2)
- Industry: fusion power
- Predecessor: Directed Technologies
- Founded: 1985; 41 years ago
- Founders: Robert W. Bussard
- Headquarters: San Diego, California, United States
- Number of employees: 5 (2025)
- Website: www.emc2fusion.com

Bussard founded Energy Matter Conversion Corporation, Inc. (EMC2) in 1985. After the HEPS program ended, the company continued its research. Successive machines were made, evolving from WB-1 to WB-8. The company won a Small Business Innovation Research (SBIR) I grant in 1992–93 and an SBIR II grant in 1994–95, both from the United States Navy. In 1993, it received a grant from the Electric Power Research Institute. In 1994, The company received small grants from NASA and Los Alamos National Laboratory (LANL). Starting in 1999, the company was primarily funded by the US Navy.

WB-1 had six conventional magnets in a cube 10 cm across. WB-2 used coils of wires to generate the magnetic field. Each electromagnet had a square cross section that created problems. The magnetic fields drove electrons into the metal rings, raising conduction losses and electron trapping. This design also suffered from "funny cusp" losses at the joints between magnets. WB-6 attempted to address these problems, by using circular rings and spacing further apart. The next device, PXL-1, built in 1996–1997, used flatter rings 26 cm across to generate the field. From 1998–2005, the company built a succession of six machines: WB-3, MPG-1,2, WB-4, PZLx-1, MPG-4 and WB-5. All of these reactors were six magnet designs built as a cube or truncated cube. Their radius ranged from 3 to 40 cm.

Initial difficulties in spherical electron confinement led to the research project's 2005 termination. However, Bussard reported a fusion rate of 10^{9} per second running D-D fusion reactions at only 12.5 kV (based on detecting nine neutrons in five tests, giving a wide confidence interval). He stated that the fusion rate achieved by WB-6 was roughly 100,000 times greater than what Farnsworth achieved at similar well depth and drive conditions. By comparison, researchers at University of Wisconsin–Madison reported a neutron rate of up to 5 billion per second at voltages of 120 kV from an electrostatic fusor without magnetic fields.

Bussard asserted, by using superconductor coils, that the only significant energy loss channel is through electron losses proportional to the surface area. He also stated that the density would scale with the square of the field (constant beta conditions), and the maximum attainable magnetic field would scale with the radius. Under those conditions, the fusion power produced would scale with the seventh power of the radius, and the energy gain would scale with the fifth power. While Bussard did not publicly document the reasoning underlying this estimate, if true, it would enable a model only ten times larger to be useful as a fusion power plant.

==== WB-6 ====
Funding became tighter and tighter. According to Bussard, "The funds were clearly needed for the more important War in Iraq." An extra $900k of Office of Naval Research funding allowed the program to continue long enough to reach WB-6 testing in November 2005. WB-6 had rings with circular cross sections that space apart at the joints. This reduced the metal surface area unprotected by magnetic fields. These changes dramatically improved system performance, leading to more electron recirculation and better electron confinement, in a progressively tighter core. This machine produced a fusion rate of 10^{9} per second. This is based on a total of nine neutrons in five tests, giving a wide confidence interval. Drive voltage on the WB-6 tests was about 12.5 kV, with a resulting potential well depth of about 10 kV. Thus deuterium ions could have a maximum of 10 keV of kinetic energy in the center. By comparison, a Fusor running deuterium fusion at 10 kV would produce a fusion rate almost too small to detect. Hirsch reported a fusion rate this high only by driving his machine with a 150 kV drop between the inside and outside cages. Hirsch also used deuterium and tritium, a much easier fuel to fuse, because it has a higher nuclear cross section.

While the WB-6 pulses were sub-millisecond, Bussard felt the physics should represent steady state. A last-minute test of WB-6 ended prematurely when the insulation on one of the hand-wound electromagnets burned through, destroying the device.

==== Efforts to restart funding ====
With no more funding during 2006, the project was stalled. This ended the US Navy's 11-year embargo on publication and publicizing between 1994 and 2005. The company's military-owned equipment was transferred to SpaceDev, which hired three of the team's researchers. After the transfer, Bussard tried to attract new investors, giving talks trying to raise interest in his design. He gave a talk at Google entitled, "Should Google Go Nuclear?" He also presented and published an overview at the 57th International Astronautical Congress in October 2006. He presented at an internal Yahoo! Tech Talk on April 10, 2007. and spoke on the internet talk radio show The Space Show on May 8, 2007. Bussard had plans for WB-8 that was a higher-order polyhedron, with 12 electromagnets. However, this design was not used in the actual WB-8 machine.

Bussard believed that the WB-6 machine had demonstrated progress and that no intermediate-scale models would be needed. He noted, "We are probably the only people on the planet who know how to make a real net power clean fusion system" He proposed to rebuild WB-6 more robustly to verify its performance. After publishing the results, he planned to convene a conference of experts in the field in an attempt to get them behind his design. The first step in that plan was to design and build two more small scale designs (WB-7 and WB-8) to determine which full scale machine would be best. He wrote "The only small scale machine work remaining, which can yet give further improvements in performance, is test of one or two WB-6-scale devices but with "square" or polygonal coils aligned approximately (but slightly offset on the main faces) along the edges of the vertices of the polyhedron. If this is built around a truncated dodecahedron, near-optimum performance is expected; about 3–5 times better than WB-6." Bussard died on October 6, 2007, from multiple myeloma at age 79.

In 2007, Steven Chu, Nobel laureate and former United States Secretary of Energy, answered a question about polywell at a tech talk at Google. He said: "So far, there's not enough information so [that] I can give an evaluation of the probability that it might work or not...But I'm trying to get more information."

==== Bridge funding 2007–2009 ====
===== Reassembling team =====
In August 2007, EMC2 received a $1.8M U.S. Navy contract. Before Bussard's death in October, 2007, Dolly Gray, who co-founded EMC2 with Bussard and served as its president and CEO, helped assemble scientists in Santa Fe to carry on. The group was led by Richard Nebel and included Princeton trained physicist Jaeyoung Park. Both physicists were on leave from LANL. The group also included Mike Wray, the physicist who ran the key 2005 tests; and Kevin Wray, the computer specialist for the operation.

===== WB-7 =====
WB-7 was constructed in San Diego and shipped to the EMC2 testing facility. The device was termed WB-7 and like prior editions, was designed by engineer Mike Skillicorn. This machine has a design similar to WB-6. WB-7 achieved "first plasma" in early January, 2008. In August 2008, the team finished the first phase of their experiment and submitted the results to a peer review board. Based on this review, federal funders agreed the team should proceed to the next phase. Nebel said "we have had some success", referring to the team's effort to reproduce the promising results obtained by Bussard. "It's kind of a mix", Nebel reported. "We're generally happy with what we've been getting out of it, and we've learned a tremendous amount" he also said.

===== 2008 =====
In September 2008 the Naval Air Warfare Center publicly pre-solicited a contract for research on an electrostatic "wiffle ball" fusion device. In October 2008 the US Navy publicly pre-solicited two more contracts with EMC2 the preferred supplier. These two tasks were to develop better instrumentation and to develop an ion injection gun. In December 2008, following many months of review by the expert review panel of the submission of the final WB-7 results, Nebel commented that "There's nothing in [the research] that suggests this will not work", but "That's a very different statement from saying that it will work."

=== 2009 to 2014 ===
==== 2009 ====
In January 2009 the Naval Air Warfare Center pre-solicited another contract for "modification and testing of plasma wiffleball 7" that appeared to be funding to install the instrumentation developed in a prior contract, install a new design for the connector (joint) between coils, and operate the modified device. The modified unit was called WB-7.1. This pre-solicitation started as a $200k contract but the final award was for $300k. In April 2009, DoD published a plan to provide EMC2 a further $2 million as part of the American Recovery and Reinvestment Act of 2009. The citation in the legislation was labelled as Plasma Fusion (Polywell) – Demonstrate fusion plasma confinement system for shore and shipboard applications; Joint OSD/USN project. The Recovery Act funded the Navy for $7.86M to construct and test a WB-8. The Navy contract had an option for an additional $4.46M. The new device increased the magnetic field strength eightfold over WB-6.

==== 2010 ====
The team built WB-8 and the computational tools to analyze and understand the data from it. The team relocated to San Diego.

==== 2011 ====
Jaeyoung Park became president. In a May interview, Park commented that "This machine [WB8] should be able to generate 1,000 times more nuclear activity than WB-7, with about eight times more magnetic field" The first WB-8 plasma was generated on November 1, 2010. By the third quarter over 500 high power plasma shots had been conducted.

==== 2012 ====
As of August 15, the Navy agreed to fund EMC2 with an additional $5.3 million over 2 years to work on pumping electrons into the wiffleball. They planned to integrate a pulsed power supply to support the electron guns (100+A, 10kV). WB-8 operated at 0.8 Tesla. Review of the work produced the recommendation to continue and expand the effort, stating: "The experimental results to date were consistent with the underlying theoretical framework of the polywell fusion concept and, in the opinion of the committee, merited continuation and expansion."

=== Going public ===
==== 2014 ====
In June EMC2 demonstrated for the first time that the electron cloud becomes diamagnetic in the center of a magnetic cusp configuration when beta is high, resolving an earlier conjecture. Whether the plasma is thermalized remains to be demonstrated experimentally. Park presented these findings at various universities, the Fusion Power Associates annual meeting and the 2014 IEC conference.

==== 2015 ====
On January 22, EMC2 presented at Microsoft Research. EMC2 planned a three-year, $30 million commercial research program to prove that the Polywell can work. On March 11, the company filed a patent application that refined the ideas in Bussard's 1985 patent. The article "High-Energy Electron Confinement in a Magnetic Cusp Configuration" was published in Physical Review X.

==== 2016 ====
On April 13, Next Big Future published an article on information of the Wiffle Ball reactor dated to 2013 through the Freedom of Information Act.

On May 2, Jaeyoung Park delivered a lecture at Khon Kaen University in Thailand, claiming that the world has so underestimated the timetable and impact that practical and economic fusion power will have, that its ultimate arrival will be highly disruptive. Park stated that he expected to present "final scientific proof of principle for the polywell technology around 2019-2020", and expects "a first generation commercial fusion reactor being developed by 2030 and then mass production and commercialisation of the technology in the 2030s. This is approximately 30 years faster than expected by the International Thermonuclear Energy Reactor (ITER) project. It would also be tens of billions of dollars cheaper."

==== 2018 ====
In May 2018 Park and Nicholas Krall filed WIPO Patent WO/2018/208953. "Generating nuclear fusion reactions with the use of ion beam injection in high pressure magnetic cusp devices," which described the polywell device in detail.

== University of Sydney experiments ==
In June 2019, the results of long-running experiments at the University of Sydney (USyd) were published in PhD thesis form by Richard Bowden-Reid. Using an experimental machine built at the university, the team probed the formation of the virtual electrodes.

Their work demonstrated that little or no trace of virtual electrode formation could be found. This left a mystery; both their machine and previous experiments showed clear and consistent evidence of the formation of a potential well that was trapping ions, which was previously ascribed to the formation of the electrodes. Exploring this problem, Bowden-Reid developed new field equations for the device that explained the potential well without electrode formation, and demonstrated that this matched both their results and those of previous experiments.

Further, exploring the overall mechanism of the virtual electrode concept demonstrated that its interactions with the ions and itself would make it "leak" at a furious rate. Assuming plasma densities and energies required for net energy production, it was calculated that new electrons would have to be supplied at an unfeasible rate of 200,000 amps.

Initial results indicate negligible charge trapping with little to no potential well formation. Further, it is shown that the existence of potential wells reported in previous publications can be explained without the requirement of a virtual cathode produced by trapped electrons. Moreover, it is shown that potential wells, which produce electron confinement and heating from virtual cathodes, no longer exist with increasing plasma density.

== Related projects ==
=== Prometheus Fusion Perfection ===
Mark Suppes built a polywell in Brooklyn. He was the first amateur to detect electron trapping using a Langmuir probe inside a polywell. He presented at the 2012 LIFT conference and the 2012 WIRED conference. The project officially ended in July 2013 due to a lack of funding.

=== University of Sydney ===
The University of Sydney in Australia conducted polywell experiments, leading to five papers in Physics of Plasmas. They also published two PhD theses and presented their work at IEC Fusion conferences.

A May 2010 paper discussed a small device's ability to capture electrons. The paper posited that the machine had an ideal magnetic field strength that maximized its ability to catch electrons. The paper analyzed polywell magnetic confinement using analytical solutions and simulations. The work linked the polywell magnetic confinement to magnetic mirror theory. The 2011 work used Particle-in-cell simulations to model particle motion in polywells with a small electron population. Electrons behaved in a similar manner to particles in the biconic cusp.

A 2013 paper measured a negative voltage inside a 4-inch aluminum polywell. Tests included measuring an internal beam of electrons, comparing the machine with and without a magnetic field, measuring the voltage at different locations and comparing voltage changes to the magnetic and electric field strength.

A 2015 paper entitled "Fusion in a magnetically-shielded-grid inertial electrostatic confinement device" presented a theory for a gridded inertial electrostatic confinement (IEC) fusion system that shows a net energy gain is possible if the grid is magnetically shielded from ion impact. The analysis indicated that better than break-even performance is possible even in a deuterium-deuterium system at bench-top scales. The proposed device had the unusual property that it can avoid both the cusp losses of traditional magnetic fusion systems and the grid losses of traditional IEC configurations.

=== Iranian Nuclear Science and Technology Research Institute ===
In November 2012, Trend News Agency reported that the Atomic Energy Organization of Iran had allocated "$8 million" to inertial electrostatic confinement research and about half had been spent. The funded group published a paper in the Journal of Fusion Energy, stating that particle-in-cell simulations of a polywell had been conducted. The study suggested that well depths and ion focus control can be achieved by variations of field strength, and referenced older research with traditional fusors. The group had run a fusor in continuous mode at −140 kV and 70 mA of current, with D-D fuel, producing 2×10^{7} neutrons per second.

=== University of Wisconsin ===
Researchers performed Vlasov–Poisson, particle-in-cell simulation work on the polywell. This was funded through the National Defense Science and Engineering Graduate Fellowship and was presented at the 2013 American Physical Society conference.

=== Convergent Scientific, Inc. ===
Convergent Scientific, Inc. (CSI) is an American company founded in December 2010 and based in Huntington Beach, California. They tested their first polywell design, the Model 1, on steady-state operations from January to late summer 2012. The MaGrid was made of a unique diamond shaped hollow wire, into which an electric current and a liquid coolant flowed. They are making an effort to build a small-scale polywell fusing deuterium. The company filed several patents and in the Fall of 2013, did a series of web-based investor pitches. The presentations mention encountering plasma instabilities including the Diocotron, two stream and Weibel instabilities. The company wants to make and sell Nitrogen-13 for PET scans.

=== Radiant Matter Research ===
Radiant Matter is a Dutch organization that has built fusors and has plans to build a polywell.

=== ProtonBoron ===
ProtonBoron is an organization that plans to build a proton-boron polywell.

=== Progressive Fusion Solutions ===
Progressive Fusion Solutions is an IEC fusion research startup who are researching Fusor and Polywell type devices.

=== Fusion One Corporation ===
Fusion One Corporation was a US organization founded by Dr. Paul Sieck (former Lead Physicist of EMC2), Dr. Scott Cornish of the University of Sydney, and Randall Volberg. It ran from 2015 to 2017. They developed a magneto-electrostatic reactor named "F1" that was based in-part on the polywell. It introduced a system of externally mounted electromagnet coils with internally mounted cathode repeller surfaces to provide a means of preserving energy and particle losses that would otherwise be lost through the magnetic cusps. In response to Todd Rider's 1995 power balance conclusions, a new analytical model was developed based on this recovery function as well as a more accurate quantum relativistic treatment of the bremsstrahlung losses that was not present in Rider's analysis. Version 1 of the analytical model was developed by Senior Theoretical Physicist Dr Vladimir Mirnov and demonstrated ample multiples of net gain with D-T and sufficient multiples with D-D to be used for generating electricity. These preliminary results were presented at the ARPA-E ALPHA 2017 Annual Review Meeting. Phase 2 of the model removed key assumptions in the Rider analysis by incorporating a self-consistent treatment of the ion energy distribution (Rider assumed a purely Maxwellian distribution) and the power required to maintain the distribution and ion population. The results yielded an energy distribution that was non-thermal but more Maxwellian than monoenergetic. The input power required to maintain the distribution was calculated to be excessive and ion-ion thermalization was a dominant loss channel. With these additions, a pathway to commercial electricity generation was no longer feasible.

== See also ==
- China Fusion Engineering Test Reactor
- Dense plasma focus
- Fusion Industry Association
- Fusion power § History
- General Fusion
- George H. Miley
- Inertial electrostatic confinement
- List of fusion experiments
- List of nuclear fusion companies
- Magnetized target fusion
- Pinch (plasma physics)
- Spherical Tokamak for Energy Production
- Stellarator
- Timeline of nuclear fusion
- Tokamak
- TAE Technologies
- Z-pinch (zeta pinch)
