= Northwest Nuclear Consortium =

The Northwest Nuclear Consortium is an organization based in Washington state which uses a research grade ion collider to teach a class of high school students nuclear engineering principles based on the Department of Energy curriculum. They won the 1st Place at WSU Imagine Tomorrow in 2012. They also won the 1st place at the Washington State Science Fair, and the 2nd place worldwide at ISEF in 2013. In 2014 they won two 2nd place at the Central Sound Regional Science Fair at Bellevue College and they won 1st place twice in category at the Washington State Science & Engineering Fair at Bremerton. In 2015, they won 14 1st-place trophies at the Washington State Science and Engineering Fair, over $250,000 in scholarships at two different colleges and 3 of the 5 available trips to ISEF, where they won 4th place in the world against 72 countries.
