= George H. Miley =

American physicist

George Hunter Miley (born 1933) is a professor emeritus of physics from the University of Illinois at Urbana–Champaign. Miley is a Guggenheim Fellow and Fellow of the American Nuclear Society, the American Physical Society and the Institute of Electrical and Electronics Engineers. He was Senior NATO Fellow from 1994 to 1995, received the Edward Teller Medal in 1995, the IEEE Nuclear and Plasma Science Award in Fusion Technology in 2003 and the Radiation Science and Technology Award in 2004. He holds several patents.

== Academic career ==
In 1955, Miley received his B.S. in Chemical Engineering/Physics from Carnegie Mellon University. He obtained his M.Sc. (1956) and his Ph.D. (1959), both in Nuclear/Chemical Engineering, from the University of Michigan.

In 1961, he became assistant professor at the University of Illinois at Urbana–Champaign, and advanced to associate professor in 1964, and to professor of nuclear and electrical engineering in 1967. He has directed the Fusion Studies Lab since 1975 and has chaired the Nuclear Engineering Program from 1983 to 1995. Since August 2010 he is professor emeritus.

He was editor-in-chief of the American Nuclear Society's journal Fusion Science and Technology until his retirement in 2000. He was also the editor-in-chief of the Journal of Plasma Physics and Laser and Particle Beams.

His work Direct Conversion of Nuclear Radiation Energy was written in 1970 and sponsored by the Atomic Energy Commission.

== Cold fusion and LENR ==
Miley has investigated nuclear transmutations in thin films of metals based on earlier work on the Patterson Power Cell, supported by Clean Energy Technologies, Incorporated (CETI). Miley is also active in research on low-energy nuclear reactions (LENR) in thin metal films.

After his retirement he participated in the 2011 World Green Energy Symposium, which was held in October 2011 at the Pennsylvania Convention Center in Philadelphia, Pennsylvania. During a Symposium session titled "Cold Fusion – A Discussion", Miley reported that he has constructed a LENR device that continuously produces several hundred watts of power.

== Publications ==
Books

- George H. Miley: Direct Conversion of Nuclear Radiation Energy, American Nuclear Society, Illinois, 1971, ASIN: B00173FBUI
- George H. Miley: Fusion Energy Conversion, American Nuclear Society, Illinois, 1976, ISBN 978-0-89448-008-9
- A. A. Harms, K. F. Schoepf, G. H. Miley, D. R. Kingdon: Principles of Fusion Energy: An Introduction to Fusion Energy for Students of Science and Engineering, World Scientific, 2000, ISBN 978-981-238-033-3
- Heinrich Hora, George Hunter Miley: Edward Teller lectures: lasers and inertial fusion energy, World Scientific, 2005, ISBN 1-86094-468-X
- George H. Miley: Life at the Center of the Energy Crisis: A Technologist's Search for a Black Swan, World Scientific, 2013, ISBN 978-981-4436-48-9
