= Phoenix (nuclear technology company) =

- PNL logo
- Type: LLC
- Industry: Energy, Medical, Defense
- Founded: 2005
- Founder: Greg Piefer
- Headquarters: Monona, Wisconsin, U.S.
- Key people: Greg Piefer, Ross Radel
- Number of employees: 30-40
- Website: phoenixwi.com

Phoenix, formerly known as Phoenix Nuclear Labs, is a company specializing in neutron generator technology located in Monona, Wisconsin, United States. Founded in 2005, the company develops nuclear and particle accelerator technologies for application in medicine, defense and energy. Phoenix has held contracts with the U.S. Army, the U.S. Department of Energy, the U.S. Department of Defense and the U.S. Air Force. Phoenix developed a proprietary gas target neutron generator technology and has designed and built a number of particle accelerator-related technologies.

== Corporate history ==
Phoenix Nuclear Labs was founded in 2005 by Dr. Gregory Piefer after he completed his PhD in Nuclear Engineering from the University of Wisconsin-Madison. Dr. Ross Radel, who joined the company in 2010, became the company president in July 2011. Retired Apollo 17 astronaut Harrison Schmitt is on the company's scientific advisory board.

In February 2014, Phoenix Nuclear Labs signed its first commercial contract to build a thermal neutron generation system for Ultra Electronics' Nuclear Control Systems, a British company that specializes in defense and security, transport and energy.

In April 2014, Phoenix Nuclear Labs was awarded $1 million from the U.S. Department of Energy to design a high-current negative hydrogen ion source under the SBIR Phase II project.

In August 2014, Phoenix Nuclear Labs and SHINE Medical Technologies successfully operated the second-generation neutron driver prototype for 24 consecutive hours with a 99% uptime. The test was said to be a key milestone towards the production of medical isotopes such as molybdenum-99 (parent isotope of the medically useful nuclear isomer ^{99m}Tc). SHINE plans to start production at a facility in Janesville, WI in 2017.

In October 2014, Phoenix Nuclear Labs announced that it was awarded a $3 million contract by the U.S. Army to develop an advanced neutron radiography imaging system. The second-generation version will be sent to Picatinny Arsenal, a military facility in New Jersey, as an upgrade to one they sent in 2013.

== Products ==
In October 2012, Phoenix Nuclear Labs received two contracts from the U.S. Army. The first contract was a $879,000 Small Business Innovation Research (SBIR) Phase II grant to help the company construct a high-flux neutron generator for the purpose of sensing improvised explosive devices (IED). The second contract was a $100,000 SBIR Phase I grant to design a neutron source for White Sands Missile Range in New Mexico. This source would be used to test the radiation resistance of military equipment and equipment to be exposed to radiation in space as an alternative to current testing methods that use highly enriched uranium. In May 2012, the company had also raised funds to develop the neutron generator.

In 2014, Phoenix Nuclear Labs also announced a successful preliminary test on the detection of 'undetectable explosives', by sensing the explosives materials instead of metal components.

=== Medical isotope production ===
Phoenix Nuclear Labs developed a proprietary gas target neutron generator technology and has designed and built a number of particle accelerator-related technologies. It has the technology to produce 3×10^{11} neutrons per second with the deuterium-deuterium fusion reaction. This can be sustained for a 24-hour period. Their spin-off company, SHINE Medical Technologies plans to open a facility for the mass production of Mo-99, an isotope used for medical care.

Molybdenum decays into technetium-99m, which is used in over 40,000 medical imaging procedures everyday in the US. Over 80% of nuclear medicine procedures rely on molybdenum to detect cancer and diagnose heart disease, among hundreds of other procedures utilizing this isotope. The U.S. obtains all of its molybdenum (representing about half of global demand) from the aging nuclear reactors outside of the U.S. However, many of these reactors are scheduled to be shut down and they furthermore utilize highly enriched uranium (HEU), which the US considers a nuclear weapons proliferation threat. To avoid the security concern of HEU, the accelerator-driven, low-enriched uranium (LEU) solution becomes the target for high-efficiency isotope production. The neutrons generated by the PNL neutron generator drive fission in a subcritical LEU solution. The LEU solution is irradiated for approximately a week and medical isotopes are then extracted from the solution, purified using established techniques and packaged for sale. The LEU solution is then recycled, achieving extremely efficient use of uranium and producing much less waste than current molybdenum production methods.

The company's neutron generators have been demonstrated to achieve over 1,000 hours of operation. The process produces medical isotopes that fit into existing supply chains while eliminating the use of weapons-grade uranium and reliance on aging nuclear reactors. For example, the Canadian National Research Universal reactor (NRU) in Chalk River, Ontario currently produces these medical isotopes. In 2006, it produced two-thirds of the world's technetium-99m. A 2009 shutdown of the NRU threatened to delay medical tests for cancer patients. Prior to the 2009 shutdown the NRU produced nearly half of the world's supply of medical isotopes.
