= Timeline of nuclear fusion =

Ongoing chronological account of events using or studying nuclear fusion

This timeline of nuclear fusion is an incomplete chronological summary of significant events in the study and use of nuclear fusion.

== 1920s ==
- 1920
  - Based on F.W. Aston's measurements of the masses of low-mass elements and Einstein's discovery that $E=mc^2$, Arthur Eddington proposes that large amounts of energy released by fusing small nuclei together provides the energy source that powers the stars.
  - Henry Norris Russell notes that the relationship in the Hertzsprung–Russell diagram suggests a hot core rather than burning throughout the star. Eddington uses this to calculate that the core would have to be about 40 million Kelvin. This was a matter of some debate at the time, because the value is much higher than what observations suggest, which is about one-third to one-half that value.
- 1928
  - George Gamow introduces the mathematical basis for quantum tunnelling.
- 1929
  - Atkinson and Houtermans provide the first calculations of the rate of nuclear fusion in stars. Based on Gamow's tunnelling, they show fusion can occur at lower energies than previously believed. When used with Eddington's calculations of the required fusion rates in stars, their calculations demonstrate this would occur at the lower temperatures that Eddington had calculated.

== 1930s ==
- 1932
  - Ernest Rutherford's Cavendish Laboratory at Cambridge University begins nuclear experiments with a particle accelerator built by John Cockcroft and Ernest Walton.
  - In April, Walton produces the first man-made nuclear disintegration by using protons from the accelerator to split lithium into alpha particles. They discover the intermediary creation of the extremely short-lived beryllium-8 isotope. This could be considered the first artificial fusion.
- 1934
  - Using an updated version of the equipment firing deuterium rather than hydrogen, Mark Oliphant discovered helium-3 and tritium, and that heavy hydrogen nuclei could be made to react with each other. This is considered the first artificial fusion.
- 1937
  - George Gamow and Carl Friedrich von Weizsäcker suggest proton combination into deuterium may be the source of stellar energy.
- 1938
  - In March, Hans Bethe attends the Carnegie Institute and George Washington University's fourth annual Washington Conference on Theoretical Physics on Edward Teller's insistence. He works with Charles Critchfield to derive stellar nuclear reactions beyond the proton combination into deuterium. They publish two reactions based on the incorrect assumption tritium is more stable, and four reactions based on the correct assumption helium-3 is more stable, thereby discovering the proton–proton chain.
  - Kantrowitz and Jacobs of the NACA Langley Research Center built a toroidal magnetic bottle and heat the plasma with a 150 W radio source. Hoping to heat the plasma to millions of degrees, the system fails and they are forced to abandon their Diffusion Inhibitor. This is the first attempt to make a working fusion reactor.
- 1939
  - Peter Thonemann develops a detailed plan for a pinch device, but is told to do other work for his thesis.
  - Hans Bethe publishes the discovery of the carbon-nitrogen-oxygen cycle in higher mass stars. Along with the proton-proton chain, this work results in the 1967 Nobel Prize for Physics.

== 1940s ==
- 1945
  - The Smyth Report, detailing the history of fission research and the Manhattan Project, briefly refers to Bethe's discovery of the CNO cycle and the eventual possibility of laboratory fusion, without using the word "fusion".
- 1946
  - George Paget Thomson of Imperial College, London designs the toroidal solenoid, a simple fusion device. With Moses Blackman, he further develops the concept and files for a patent. This becomes the first fusion device to receive a patent. Repeated attempts to get development funding fail.
- 1947
  - A meeting at Harwell on the topic of fusion raises new concerns with the concept. On his return to London, Thomson gets graduate students James L. Tuck and Alan Alfred Ware to build a prototype device out of old radar parts.
  - Peter Thonemann comes up with a similar idea, but uses a different method of heating the fuel. This seems much more practical and finally gains the mild interest of the UK nuclear establishment. Not aware of who he is talking to, Thonemann describes the concept to Thomson, who adopts the same concept.
  - Herbert Skinner begins to write a lengthy report on the entire fusion concept, pointing out several areas of little or no knowledge.
- 1948
  - The Ministry of Supply (MoS) asks Thomson about the status of his patent filing, and he describes the problems he has getting funding. The MoS forces Harwell to provide some money, and Thomson releases his rights to the patent. It is granted late that year.
  - Skinner publishes his report, calling for some experimental effort to explore the areas of concern. Along with the MoS's calls for funding of Thomson, this event marks the beginning of formal fusion research in the UK.

== 1950s ==
- 1950
  - In January, Klaus Fuchs admits to passing nuclear secrets to the Soviet Union. Almost all nuclear research in the UK, including the fledgling fusion program, is immediately classified. Thomson, until this time working at Imperial University, is moved to the Atomic Weapons Research Establishment.
  - The tokamak, a type of magnetic confinement fusion device, was proposed by Soviet scientists Andrei Sakharov and Igor Tamm.
    The United States test Greenhouse George, the first use of artificial thermonuclear fusion, in 1951
- 1951
  - Edward Teller and Stanislaw Ulam at Los Alamos National Laboratory (LANL) develop the Teller-Ulam design for the thermonuclear weapon, allowing for the development of multi-megaton weapons.
  - A press release from Argentina claims that their Huemul Project had produced controlled nuclear fusion. This prompted a wave of responses in other countries, especially the U.S.
    - Lyman Spitzer dismisses the Argentinian claims, but while thinking about it comes up with the stellarator concept. Funding is arranged under Project Matterhorn and develops into the Princeton Plasma Physics Laboratory.
    - Tuck introduces the British pinch work to LANL. He develops the Perhapsatron under the codename Project Sherwood. The project name is a play on his name via Friar Tuck.
    - Richard F. Post presents his magnetic mirror concept and also receives initial funding, eventually moving to Lawrence Livermore National Laboratory (LLNL).
    - In the UK, repeated requests for more funding that had previously been turned down are suddenly approved. Within a short time, three separate efforts are started, one at Harwell and two at Atomic Weapons Establishment (Aldermaston). Early planning for a much larger machine at Harwell begins.
    - Using the Huemul release as leverage, Soviet researchers find their funding proposals rapidly approved. Work on linear pinch machines begins that year.
  - On May 9, the American nuclear test Greenhouse George, the first of a boosted fission weapon, yields 255 kilotons from an enriched uranium core and deuterium-tritium gas. This is the artificial thermonuclear fusion, and the first weaponization of fusion energy.
  - Experimental research of toroidal magnetic confinement systems starts at the Kurchatov Institute, Moscow, led by a group of Soviet scientists led by Lev Artsimovich. Device chambers are constructed from glass, porcelain, or metal. Their largest device, TMP, uses a porcelain chamber with metal spirals.

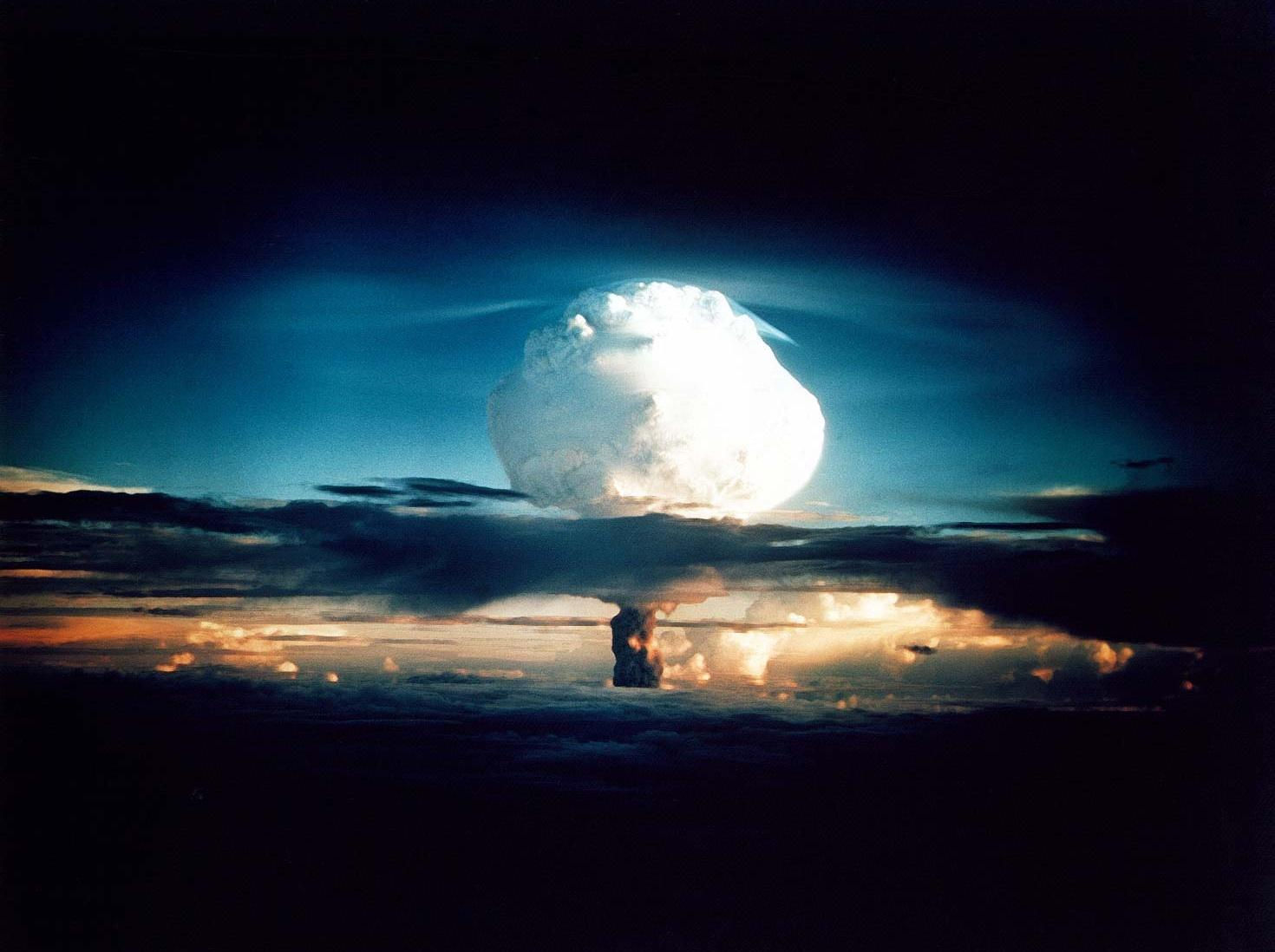
The United States test Ivy Mike, the first full thermonuclear weapon, in 1952.

- 1952
  - On November 1, the United States conducts the Ivy Mike shot of Operation Ivy, the first detonation of a hydrogen bomb, yields 10.4 megatons of TNT out of a fusion fuel of liquid deuterium.
  - Cousins and Ware build a larger toroidal pinch device in England and demonstrated that the plasma in pinch devices is inherently unstable.
- 1953
  - The first Soviet fusion bomb test, RDS-6s, American codename "Joe 4", demonstrated the first fission/fusion/fission "layercake" design, limited below the megaton range, with less than 20% of the yield coming directly from fusion. It was quickly superseded by the Teller-Ulam design. This was the first aerial drop of a fusion weapon.
  - Linear pinch devices in the US and USSR report detections of neutrons, an indication of fusion reactions. Both are later explained as coming from instabilities in the fuel, and are non-fusion in nature.
  - Scientists at the Princeton Plasma Physics Laboratory construct Model A, the first operational stellarator.
- 1954
  - Early planning for the large ZETA device at Harwell begins. The name is a take-off on small experimental fission reactors which often had "zero energy" in their name, ZEEP being an example.
  - Edward Teller gives a now-famous speech on plasma stability in magnetic bottles at the Princeton Gun Club. His work suggests that most magnetic bottles are inherently unstable, outlining what is today known as the interchange instability.
- 1955
  - At the first Atoms for Peace meeting in Geneva, Homi J. Bhabha predicts that fusion will be in commercial use within two decades. This prompts a number of countries to begin fusion research; Japan, France, and Sweden all start programs this year or the next.
  - Scientists in the Soviet Union achieve the first fusion via a purely chemical explosive-driven implosion, using spherical shock waves to compress a $\ce{UD2T}$ target.
- 1956
  - Construction of ZETA begins at Harwell.
  - Igor Kurchatov gives a talk at Harwell on pinch devices, revealing for the first time that the USSR is also working on fusion. He details the problems they are seeing, mirroring those in the US and UK.
  - In August, a number of articles on plasma physics appear in various Soviet journals.
  - In the wake of the Kurchatov's speech, the US and UK begin to consider releasing their own data. Eventually, they settle on a release prior to the 2nd Atoms for Peace conference in Geneva in 1958.
  - On May 27, the United States conducts the Zuni test of Operation Redwing with a Mk-41 bomb, the first test of a three-stage hydrogen bomb.
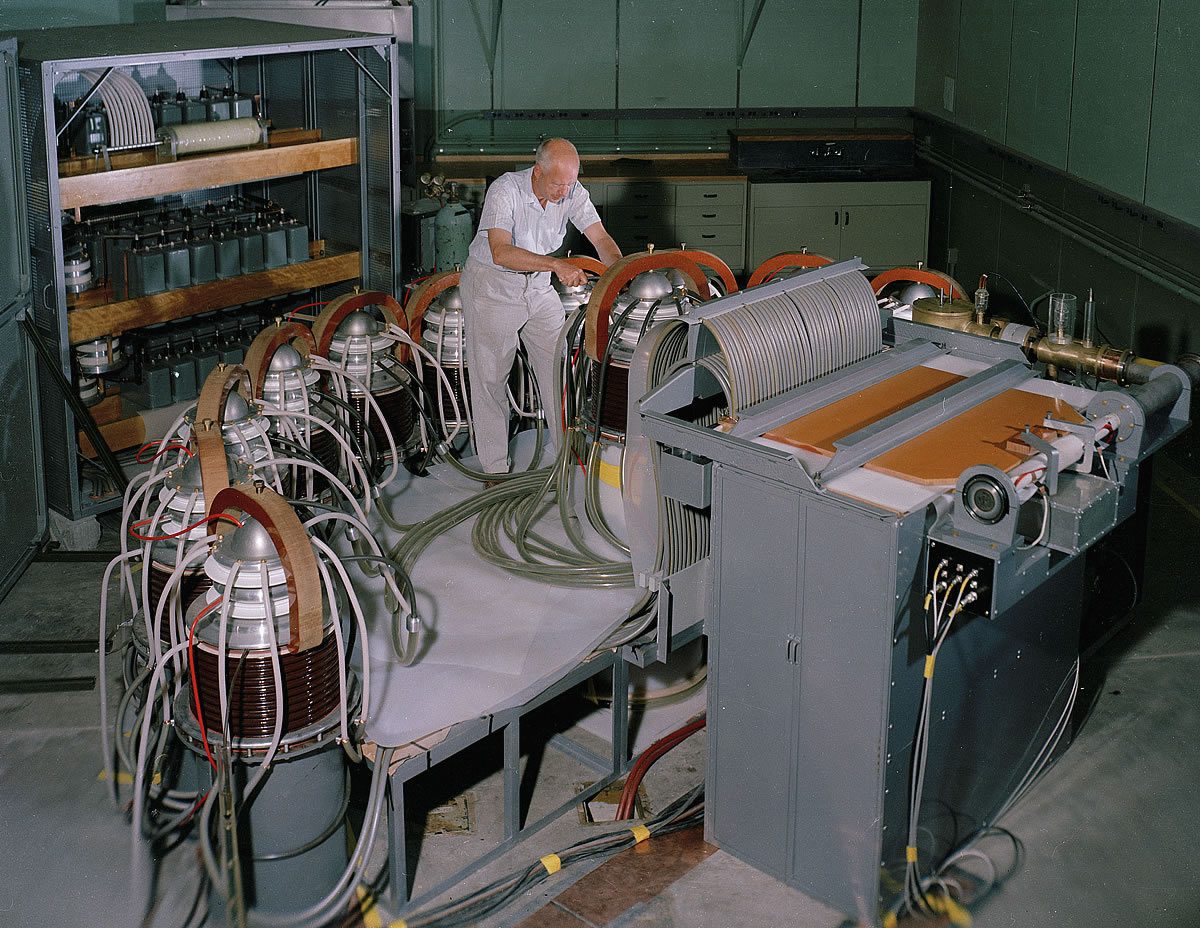
    Scylla I, the first device to achieve controlled thermonuclear fusion, in 1958. It was a theta pinch design built by Los Alamos National Laboratory.
- 1957
  - In the US, at LANL, Scylla I begins operation using the θ-pinch design.
  - ZETA is completed in the summer, it will be the largest fusion machine for a decade.
  - In August, initial results on ZETA appear to suggest the machine has successfully reached basic fusion temperatures. UK researchers start pressing for public release, while the US demurs.
  - Scientists at the AEI Research laboratory in Harwell reported that the Sceptre III plasma column remained stable for 300 to 400 microseconds, a dramatic improvement on previous efforts. Working backward, the team calculated that the plasma had an electrical resistivity around 100 times that of copper, and was able to carry 200 kA of current for 500 microseconds in total.
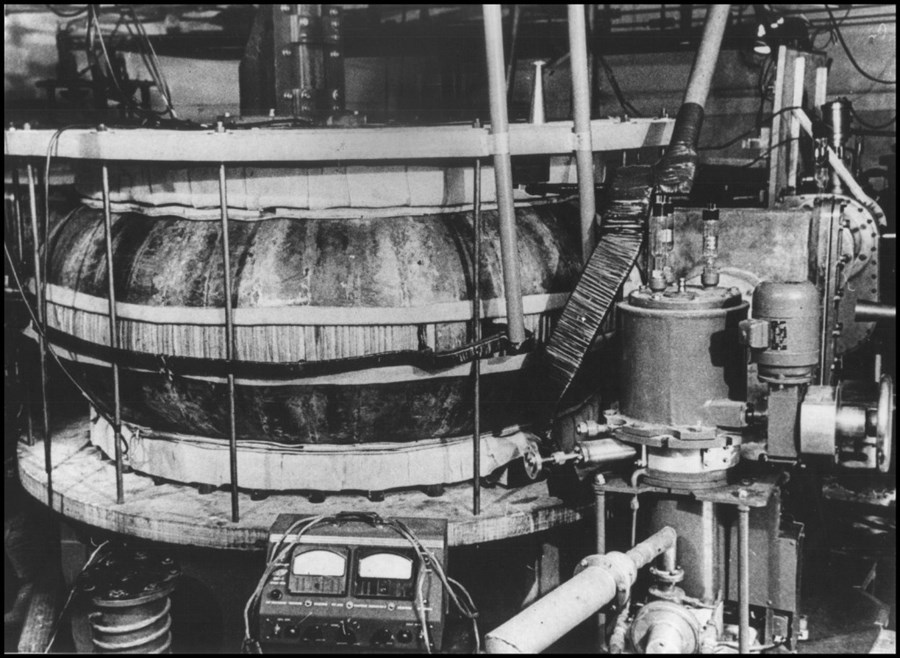
    T-1, the first operational tokamak, built by the Kurchatov Institute in 1958.
- 1958
  - In January, the US and UK release large amounts of data, with the ZETA team claiming fusion. Other researchers, notably Artsimovich and Spitzer, are sceptical.
  - In May, a series of new tests demonstrate the measurements on ZETA were erroneous, and the claims of fusion have to be retracted.
  - American, British and Soviet scientists began to share previously classified controlled fusion research as part of the Atoms for Peace conference in Geneva in September. It is the largest international scientific meeting to date. It becomes clear that basic pinch concepts are not successful and that no device has yet created fusion at any level.
  - Scylla demonstrates the first controlled thermonuclear fusion in any laboratory, although confirmation came too late to be announced at Geneva. This θ-pinch approach will ultimately be abandoned as calculations show it cannot scale up to produce a reactor.
  - The Kurchatov Institute constructs its first toroidal device with an all-metal chamber, T-1, considered to be the first operational tokamak.

== 1960s ==
- 1960
  - After considering the concept for some time, John Nuckolls publishes the concept of inertial confinement fusion. The laser, introduced the same year, appears to be a suitable "driver".
- 1961
  - The Soviet Union test the Tsar Bomba (50 megatons), the most powerful thermonuclear weapon ever.
- 1964
  - Plasma temperatures of approximately 40 million degrees Celsius and a few billion deuteron-deuteron fusion reactions per discharge were achieved at LANL with the Scylla IV device.
- 1965
  - At an international meeting at the UK's new fusion research centre in Culham, the Soviets release early results showing greatly improved performance in toroidal pinch machines. The announcement is met by scepticism, especially by the UK team whose ZETA was largely identical. Spitzer, chairing the meeting, essentially dismisses it out of hand.
  - At the same meeting, odd results from the ZETA machine are published. It will be years before the significance of these results are realized.
  - By the end of the meeting, it is clear that most fusion efforts have stalled. All of the major designs, including the stellarator, pinch machines and magnetic mirrors are all losing plasma at rates that are simply too high to be useful in a reactor setting. Less-known designs like the levitron and astron are faring no better.
  - The 12-beam "4 pi laser" using ruby as the lasing medium is developed at Lawrence Livermore National Laboratory (LLNL) includes a gas-filled target chamber of about 20 centimeters in diameter.
- 1967
  - Demonstration of Farnsworth-Hirsch Fusor appeared to generate neutrons in a nuclear reaction.
  - Hans Bethe wins the 1967 Nobel Prize in Physics for his publication on how fusion powers the stars in work of 1939.
  - KMS Industries, later renamed KMS Fusion, is founded in Ann Arbor, Michigan and became the world's first company to work to develop inertial confinement fusion power. Closed in 1990, their work was moved to General Atomics.
- 1968
  - Robert L. Hirsch is hired by Amasa Bishop of the Atomic Energy Commission as staff physicist. Hirsch would eventually end up running the fusion program during the 1970s.
  - Further results from the T-3 tokamak, similar to the toroidal pinch machine mentioned in 1965, claims temperatures to be over an order of magnitude higher than any other device. The Western scientists remain highly sceptical.
  - The Soviets invite a UK team from ZETA to perform independent measurements on T-3.
- 1969
  - The UK team, nicknamed "The Culham Five", confirm the Soviet results early in the year. They publish their results in October's edition of Nature. This leads to a "veritable stampede" of tokamak construction around the world.
  - After learning of the Culham Five's results in August, a furious debate breaks out in the US establishment over whether or not to build a tokamak. After initially pooh-poohing the concept, the Princeton group eventually decides to convert their stellarator to a tokamak.
  - The Kurchatov Institute detects neutrons from deuterium plasma in their T-3A tokamak, marking the first fusion in a tokamak device.

== 1970s ==
- 1970
  - Princeton's conversion of the Model C stellarator to the Symmetrical Tokamak is completed, and tests match and then best the Soviet results. With an apparent solution to the magnetic bottle problem in-hand, plans begin for a larger machine to test the scaling and various methods to heat the plasma.
  - Kapchinskii and Teplyakov introduce a particle accelerator for heavy ions that appear suitable as an ICF driver in place of lasers.
- 1972
  - The first neodymium-doped glass (Nd:glass) laser for ICF research, the "Long Path laser" is completed at LLNL and is capable of delivering ~50 joules to a fusion target.
- 1973
  - Design work on JET, the Joint European Torus, begins.
  - The Kurchatov Institute begins development of T-8 and T-9, investing non-circular tokamak cross-sections such as the T-8's D-shaped design.
- 1974
  - J.B. Taylor re-visited ZETA results of 1958 and explained that the quiet-period was in fact very interesting. This led to the development of reversed field pinch, now generalised as "self-organising plasmas", an ongoing line of research.
  - KMS Fusion, a private-sector company, builds an ICF reactor using laser drivers. Despite limited resources and numerous business problems, KMS successfully compresses fuel in December 1973, and on 1 May 1974 successfully demonstrates the world's first laser-induced fusion. Neutron-sensitive nuclear emulsion detectors, developed by Nobel Prize winner Robert Hofstadter, were used to provide evidence of this discovery.
  - Beams using mature high-energy accelerator technology are hailed as the elusive "brand-X" driver capable of producing fusion implosions for commercial power. The Livingston Curve, which illustrates the improvement in power of particle accelerators over time, is modified to show the energy needed for fusion to occur. Experiments commence on the single beam LLNL Cyclops laser, testing new optical designs for future ICF lasers.
- 1975
  - The Princeton Large Torus (PLT), the follow-on to the Symmetrical Tokamak, begins operation. It soon surpasses the best Soviet machines and sets several temperature records that are above what is needed for a commercial reactor. PLT continues to set records until it is decommissioned.
- 1976
  - Workshop, called by the US-ERDA (now DoE) at the Claremont Hotel in Berkeley, CA for an ad-hoc two-week summer study. Fifty senior scientists from the major US ICF programs and accelerator laboratories participated, with program heads and Nobel laureates also attending. In the closing address, Dr. C. Martin Stickley, then Director of US-ERDA's Office of Inertial Fusion, announced the conclusion was "no showstoppers" on the road to fusion energy.
  - The two beam Argus laser is completed at LLNL and experiments involving more advanced laser-target interactions commence.
  - Based on the continued success of the PLT, the DOE selects a larger Princeton design for further development. Initially designed simply to test a commercial-sized tokamak, the DOE team instead gives them the explicit goal of running on a deuterium-tritium fuel as opposed to test fuels like hydrogen or deuterium. The project is given the name Tokamak Fusion Test Reactor (TFTR).
  - The Kurchatov Institute builds the TO-2, the first tokamak with a divertor, using a toroidal configuration which would soon be superseded by poloidal divertors.
- 1977
  - The 20 beam Shiva laser at LLNL is completed, capable of delivering 10.2 kilojoules of infrared energy on target. At a price of $25 million and a size approaching that of a football field, the Shiva laser is the first of the "megalasers" at LLNL and brings the field of ICF research fully within the realm of "big science".
  - The JET project is given the go-ahead by the EC, choosing the UK's center at Culham as its site.

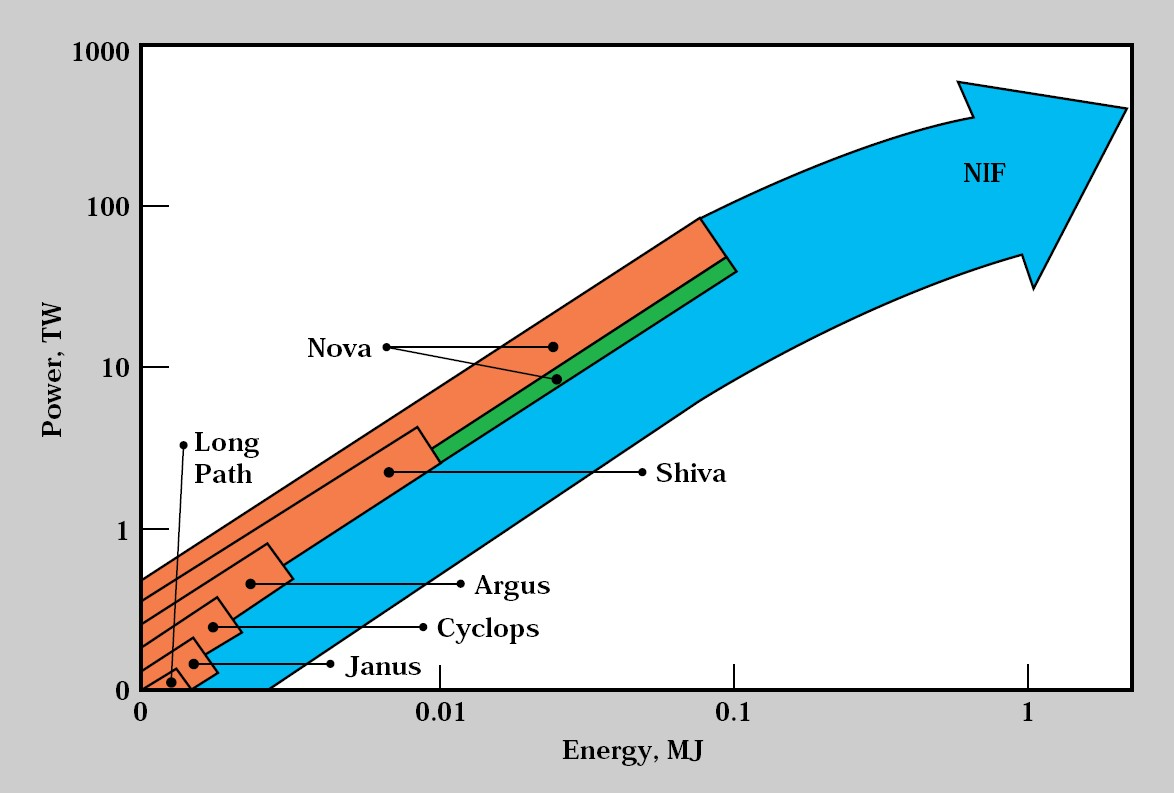
Progress in power and energy levels attainable by inertial confinement lasers has increased dramatically since the early 1970s.

- 1978
  - As PLT continues to set new records, Princeton is given additional funding to adapt TFTR with the explicit goal of reaching breakeven.
  - The Kurchatov Institute builds the T-7, the first full-scale tokamak to use superconducting coils, using an $\ce{NbTi}$ alloy.
- 1979
  - LANL successfully demonstrates the radio frequency quadrupole accelerator (RFQ).
  - ANL and Hughes Research Laboratories demonstrate required ion source brightness with xenon beam at 1.5MeV.
  - The Foster Panel report to US-DoE's Energy Research and advisory board on ICF concludes that heavy ion fusion (HIF) is the "conservative approach" to ICF. Listing HIF's advantages in his report, John Foster remarked: "...now that is kind of exciting." After DoE Office of Inertial Fusion completed review of programs, Director Gregory Canavan decides to accelerate the HIF effort.

== 1980s ==
- 1980
  - Scientists in the Soviet Union report the first conical target fusion, produced by the impact of a metal projectile containing deuterium, accelerated by chemical explosives to 5.4 km/s.
- 1982
  - HIBALL study by German and US institutions, Garching uses the high repetition rate of the RF accelerator driver to serve four reactor chambers and first-wall protection using liquid lithium inside the chamber cavity.
  - Tore Supra construction starts at Cadarache, France. Its superconducting magnets will permit it to generate a strong permanent toroidal magnetic field.
  - high-confinement mode (H-mode) discovered in tokamaks.
- 1983
  - Joint European Torus, the largest operational magnetic confinement plasma physics experiment is completed on time and on budget. First plasmas achieved.
  - The NOVETTE laser at LLNL comes on line and is used as a test bed for the next generation of ICF lasers, specifically the NOVA laser.
- 1984
  - The huge 10 beam NOVA laser at LLNL is completed and switches on in December. NOVA would ultimately produce a maximum of 120 kilojoules of infrared laser light during a nanosecond pulse in a 1989 experiment.
- 1985
  - National Academy of Sciences reviewed military ICF programs, noting HIF's major advantages clearly but averring that HIF was "supported primarily by other [than military] programs". The review of ICF by the National Academy of Sciences marked the trend with the observation: "The energy crisis is dormant for the time being." Energy becomes the sole purpose of heavy ion fusion.
  - The Japanese tokamak, JT-60 completed. First plasmas achieved.
- 1988
  - The T-15, Soviet tokamak with superconducting helium-cooled coils completed.
  - The Conceptual Design Activity for the International Thermonuclear Experimental Reactor (ITER), the successor to T-15, TFTR, JET and JT-60, begins. Participants include EURATOM, Japan, the Soviet Union and United States. It ended in 1990.
  - The first plasma produced at Tore Supra in April.
- 1989
  - On March 23, two Utah electrochemists, Stanley Pons and Martin Fleischmann, announced that they had achieved cold fusion: fusion reactions which could occur at room temperatures. However, they made their announcements before any peer review of their work was performed, and no subsequent experiments by other researchers revealed any evidence of fusion.

== 1990s ==
- 1990
  - Decision to construct the National Ignition Facility "beamlet" laser at LLNL is made.
- 1991
  - The START Tokamak fusion experiment begins in Culham. The experiment would eventually achieve a record beta (plasma pressure compared to magnetic field pressure) of 40% using a neutral beam injector. It was the first design that adapted the conventional toroidal fusion experiments into a tighter spherical design.
  - The JT-60 tokamak was upgraded to JT-60U in March.
  - On November 9, the JET tokamak achieves the first 50-50 mix deuterium-tritium fusion experiments via magnetic confinement.
- 1992
  - The Engineering Design Activity for the ITER starts with participants EURATOM, Japan, Russia and United States. It ended in 2001.
  - The United States and the former republics of the Soviet Union cease nuclear weapons testing.
- 1993
  - The TFTR tokamak at Princeton (PPPL) experiments with a 50% deuterium, 50% tritium mix, eventually producing as much as 10 megawatts of power from a controlled fusion reaction.
- 1994
  - NIF Beamlet laser is completed and begins experiments validating the expected performance of NIF.
  - The USA declassifies information about indirectly driven (hohlraum) target design.
  - Comprehensive European-based study of HIF driver begins, centered at the Gesellschaft für Schwerionenforschung (GSI) and involving 14 laboratories, including USA and Russia. The Heavy Ion Driven Inertial Fusion (HIDIF) study will be completed in 1997.
- 1996
  - A record is reached at Tore Supra: a plasma duration of two minutes with a current of almost 1 million amperes driven non-inductively by 2.3 MW of lower hybrid frequency waves (i.e. 280 MJ of injected and extracted energy). This result was possible due to the actively cooled plasma-facing components installed in the machine.
  - On 31 October, the JT-60U tokamak achieves the first extrapolated breakeven at Q_{DT}^{eq} = 1.05.
  - The Comprehensive Nuclear-Test-Ban Treaty is signed, ending weapons testing by almost all nuclear states. ICF experiments and supercomputer simulation gain funding under the US Science-Based Stockpile Stewardship and similar programs.
- 1997
  - The JET tokamak in the UK produces 16 MW of fusion power - this remains the world record for fusion power until 2022 when JET sets an even higher record. Four megawatts of alpha particle self-heating was achieved.
  - LLNL study compared projected costs of power from ICF and other fusion approaches to the projected future costs of existing energy sources.
  - National Ignition Facility: Groundbreaking ceremony
- 1998
  - The JT-60U tokamak achieves an extrapolated breakeven of Q_{DT}^{eq} = 1.25, the current world record.
  - Results of European-based study of heavy ion driven fusion power system (HIDIF, GSI-98-06) incorporates telescoping beams of multiple isotopic species. This technique multiplies the 6-D phase space usable for the design of HIF drivers.
- 1999
  - The United States withdraws from the ITER project.
  - The START experiment is succeeded by MAST.

== 2000s ==
- 2001
  - National Ignition Facility: Facility construction completed, laser construction begins
  - Negotiations on the Joint Implementation of ITER begin between Canada, countries represented by the European Union, Japan and Russia.
- 2002
  - Claims and counter-claims are published regarding bubble fusion, in which a table-top apparatus was reported as producing small-scale fusion in a liquid undergoing acoustic cavitation. Like cold fusion (see 1989), it is later dismissed.
  - European Union proposes Cadarache in France and Vandellos in Spain as candidate sites for ITER while Japan proposes Rokkasho.
- 2003
  - The United States rejoins the ITER project with China and Republic of Korea also joining. Canada withdraws.
  - Cadarache in France is selected as the European Candidate Site for ITER.
  - In April, Sandia National Laboratories' Z machine produces its first DD fusion neutrons.
  - National Ignition Facility: First laser pulse (10.4 kJ IR, 4 beams).
- 2004
  - The United States drops its own ITER-scale tokamak project, FIRE, recognising an inability to match EU progress.
- 2005
  - In August, the first proton-boron fusion via inertial confinement is reported.
  - Following final negotiations between the EU and Japan, ITER chooses Cadarache over Rokkasho for the site of the reactor. In concession, Japan is able to host the related materials research facility and granted rights to fill 20% of the project's research posts while providing 10% of the funding.
  - National Ignition Facility: First eight-beam laser pulse (152.8 kJ IR). It becomes the world's largest laser.
- 2006
  - China's Experimental Advanced Superconducting Tokamak is completed, the first tokamak to toroidal and poloidal superconducting magnets.
- 2009
  - National Ignition Facility: On February 26, all 192 beams are fired for the first time.
  - National Ignition Facility: In June, the first laser shots are fired into a hohlraum.
  - Ricardo Betti, the third Under Secretary, responsible for Nuclear Energy, testifies before Congress: "IFE [ICF for energy production] has no home".

== 2010s ==
- 2010
  - HIF-2010 Symposium in Darmstadt, Germany. Robert J Burke presented on Single Pass (Heavy Ion Fusion) HIF and Charles Helsley made a presentation on the commercialization of HIF within the decade.
- 2011
  - May 23–26, Workshop for Accelerators for Heavy Ion Fusion at Lawrence Berkeley National Laboratory, presentation by Robert J. Burke on "Single Pass Heavy Ion Fusion". The Accelerator Working Group publishes recommendations supporting moving RF accelerator driven HIF toward commercialization.
- 2012
  - Stephen Slutz & Roger Vesey of Sandia National Labs publish a paper in Physical Review Letters presenting a computer simulation of the MagLIF concept showing it can produce high gain. According to the simulation, a 70 Mega Amp Z-pinch facility in combination with a Laser may be able to produce a spectacular energy return of 1000 times the expended energy. A 60 MA facility would produce a 100x yield.
  - JET announces a major breakthrough in controlling instabilities in a fusion plasma. One step closer to controlling nuclear fusion
  - In August Robert J. Burke presents updates to the SPRFD HIF process and Charles Helsley presents the Economics of SPRFD at the 19th International HIF Symposium at Berkeley, California. Industry was there in support of ion generation for SPRFD. The Fusion Power Corporation SPRFD patent is granted in Russia.
- 2013
  - China's EAST tokamak test reactor achieves a record confinement time of 30 seconds for plasma in the high-confinement mode (H-mode), thanks to improvements in heat dispersal from tokamak walls. This is an improvement of an order of magnitude with respect to state-of-the-art reactors.
  - Construction of JT-60SA begins in January.
- 2014
  - US Scientists at NIF successfully generate more energy from fusion reactions than the energy absorbed by the nuclear fuel.
  - Phoenix Nuclear Labs announces the sale of a high-yield neutron generator that could sustain 5×10^{11} deuterium fusion reactions per second over a 24-hour period.
  - On 9 October 2014, fusion research bodies from European Union member states and Switzerland signed an agreement to cement European collaboration on fusion research and EUROfusion, the European Consortium for the Development of Fusion Energy, was born.
- 2015
  - In January the polywell is presented at Microsoft Research.
  - In August, MIT announces the ARC fusion reactor, a compact tokamak using rare-earth barium-copper oxide (REBCO) superconducting tapes to produce high-magnetic field coils that it claims produce comparable magnetic field strength in a smaller configuration than other designs.
- 2016
  - The Wendelstein 7-X produces the device's first hydrogen plasma.
- 2017
  - China's EAST tokamak test reactor achieves a stable 101.2-second steady-state high confinement plasma, setting a world record in long-pulse H-mode operation on the night of July 3.
  - UK company Tokamak Energy's ST40 fusion reactor generates first plasma.
  - TAE Technologies announces that the Norman reactor had achieved plasma.
  - On March 7, Japan's Large Helical Device completes its first deuterium plasma experiment, marking the first fusion in a stellarator device.
- 2018
  - Energy corporation Eni announces a $50 million investment in start-up Commonwealth Fusion Systems, to commercialize ARC technology via the SPARC test reactor in collaboration with MIT.
  - MIT scientists formulate a theoretical means to remove the excess heat from compact nuclear fusion reactors via larger and longer divertors.
  - TAE Technologies announces its reactor has reached a high temperature of nearly 20 million °C.
  - The Fusion Industry Association founded as an initiative in 2018, is the unified voice of the fusion industry, working to transform the energy system with commercially viable fusion power.
- 2019
  - The United Kingdom announces a planned £200-million (US$248-million) investment to produce a design for the Spherical Tokamak for Energy Production (STEP) fusion facility around 2040.

== 2020s ==
The US has been counting on private industry to lead in fusion power, while more recently China's government has made fusion a national priority. In 2025, $2.1 billion was poured into a single Chinese state-owned fusion company, an amount two and a half times the U.S. Energy Department's annual fusion budget.

- 2020
  - Assembly of ITER, which has been under construction for years, commences.
  - The Chinese experimental nuclear fusion reactor HL-2M is turned on for the first time, achieving its first plasma discharge.
  - On November 1, the National Ignition Facility records the first burning plasma achieved in a laboratory.
- 2021
  - On August 8, the National Ignition Facility records the first experiment to surpass the Lawson criterion.
  - [Record] China's Experimental Advanced Superconducting Tokamak sustains a high-temperature plasma for 101 seconds (120 million °C).
  - [Record] The National Ignition Facility achieves Q = 0.70.
  - [Record] China's Experimental Advanced Superconducting Tokamak sustains a high-temperature plasma for 1,056 seconds (70 million °C).
- 2022
  - [Record] The Joint European Torus in Oxford, UK, produces a 59 MJ pulse (5 seconds).
  - [Record] On August 8, the National Ignition Facility records the first laboratory plasma ignition. The energy gain factor was Q = 0.72, the ratio of laser beam input to fusion output.
  - [Record] On December 5, the National Ignition Facility records the first experiment to surpass scientific breakeven, achieving an energy gain factor of Q = 1.54, producing more fusion energy than the laser beam delivered to the target. Laser efficiency is on the order of 1%.
- 2023
  - [Record] On February 15, 2023, Wendelstein 7-X reached a new milestone: Power plasma with gigajoule energy turnover generated for eight minutes.
  - On February 21, 2023, the first proton-boron fusion via magnetic confinement is reported at Japan's Large Helical Device.
  - JT-60SA achieves first plasma in October, making it the largest operational superconducting tokamak in the world.
  - On 18 December, Joint European Torus pulses its final plasma before decommissioning, after over 40 years of operation.
- 2024
  - In June, the HH70 tokamak, built by the Chinese company Energy Singularity, achieves first plasma. It is the first fusion device to exclusively use high-temperature superconducting magnets.
  - On February 26, the Korean Superconducting Tokamak Advanced Research records a high-temperature plasma for 48 seconds (100 million °C).
- 2025
  - On February 12, the CEA's WEST machine was able to maintain a plasma for more than 22 minutes. This was a 25% improvement on the previous record time achieved with EAST, in China, a few weeks previously.
