= Interchange instability =

The interchange instability, also known as the Kruskal–Schwarzschild instability or flute instability, is a type of plasma instability seen in magnetic fusion energy that is driven by the gradients in the magnetic pressure in areas where the confining magnetic field is curved.

The name of the instability refers to the action of the plasma changing position with the magnetic field lines (i.e. an interchange of the lines of force in space) without significant disturbance to the geometry of the external field. The instability causes flute-like structures to appear on the surface of the plasma, hence it is also referred to as the flute instability. The interchange instability is a key issue in the field of fusion energy, where magnetic fields are used to confine a plasma in a volume surrounded by the field.

The basic concept was first noted in a 1954 paper by Martin David Kruskal and Martin Schwarzschild, who demonstrated that a situation similar to the Rayleigh–Taylor instability in classic fluids existed in magnetically confined plasmas. The problem can occur anywhere where the magnetic field is concave with the plasma on the inside of the curve. Edward Teller gave a talk on the issue at a meeting later that year, pointing out that it appeared to be an issue in most of the fusion devices being studied at that time. He used the analogy of rubber bands on the outside of a blob of jelly; there is a natural tendency for the bands to snap together and eject the jelly from the center.

Most machines of that era suffered from other instabilities that were far more powerful, and whether or not the interchange instability was taking place could not be confirmed. This was finally demonstrated beyond doubt by a Soviet magnetic mirror machine during an international meeting in 1961. When the US delegation stated they were not seeing this problem in their mirrors, it was pointed out they were making an error in the use of their instrumentation. When that was considered, it was clear the US experiments were also being affected by the same problem. This led to a series of new mirror designs, as well as modifications to other designs like the stellarator to add negative curvature. These had cusp-shaped fields so that the plasma was contained within convex fields, the so-called "magnetic well" configuration.

In modern designs, the interchange instability is suppressed by the complex shaping of the fields. In the tokamak design there are still areas of "bad curvature", but particles within the plasma spend only a short time in those areas before being circulated to an area of "good curvature". Modern stellarators use similar configurations, differing from tokamaks largely in how that shaping is created.

== Basic concept ==
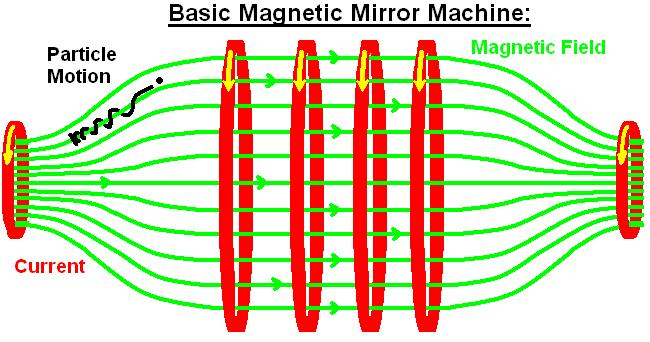
A basic magnetic mirror. The magnetic lines of force (green) confine plasma particles by causing them to rotate around the lines (black). As the particles approach the ends of the mirror, they see an increasing force back into the center of the chamber. Ideally, all particles would continue to be reflected and stay within the machine.

Magnetic confinement systems attempt to hold the plasma within a vacuum chamber using magnetic fields. The plasma particles are electrically charged, and thus see a transverse force from the field due to the Lorentz force. When the particle's original linear motion is superimposed on this transverse force, its resulting path through space is a helix, or corkscrew shape. Such a field will thus trap the plasma by forcing it to flow along the lines.

One can produce a linear field using an electromagnet in the form of a solenoid wrapped around a tubular vacuum chamber. In this case, the plasma will orbit the lines running down the center of the chamber and be prevented from moving outward towards the walls. This does not confine the plasma along the length of the tube, and it will rapidly flow out the ends. Designs that prevented this from occurring appeared in the early 1950s and experiments began in earnest in 1953. However, all of these devices proved to leak plasma at rates far higher than expected.

In May 1954, Martin David Kruskal and Martin Schwarzschild published a paper demonstrating two effects that meant plasmas in magnetic fields were inherently unstable. One of the two effects, which became known as the kink instability, was already being seen in early z-pinch experiments and occurred slowly enough to be captured on movie film. The topic of stability immediately gained significance in the field.

The other instability noted in the paper considered an infinite sheet of plasma held up against gravity by a magnetic field. It suggested there would be behaviour similar to that in classical physics when one heavy fluid is supported by a lighter one, which leads to the Rayleigh–Taylor instability. Any small vertical disturbance in an initially uniform field would result in the field pulling on the charges laterally and causing the initial disturbance to be further magnified. As large sheets of plasma were not common in existing devices, the outcome of this effect was not immediately obvious. It was not long before a corollary became obvious; the initial disturbance resulted in a curved interface between the plasma and the external field, and this was inherent to any design that had a convex area in the field.

In October 1954 a meeting of the still-secret Project Sherwood researchers was held at Princeton University's Gun Club building. Edward Teller brought up the topic of this instability and noted that two of the major designs being considered, the stellarator and the magnetic mirror, both had large areas of such curvature and thus should be expected to be inherently unstable. He further illustrated it by comparing the situation to jello being held together with rubber bands; while such a setup might be created, any slight disturbance would cause the rubber bands to contract and eject the jello. This exchange of position appeared to be identical to the mirror case in particular, where the plasma naturally wanted to expand while the magnetic fields had an internal tension.

No such behaviour had been seen in experimental devices, but as the situation was considered further, it became clear it would be more obvious in areas of greater curvature, and existing devices used relatively weak magnetic fields with relatively flat fields. This nevertheless presented a significant problem; a key measure of the attractiveness of a reactor design was its beta, the ratio of magnetic field strength to confined plasma - higher beta meant more plasma for the same magnet, which was a significant factor in cost. However, higher beta also implied more curvature in these devices, which would make them increasingly unstable. This might force reactors to operate at low beta and be doomed to be economically unattractive.

As the magnitude of the problem became clear, the meeting turned to the question of whether or not there was any arrangement that was naturally stable. Jim Tuck was able to provide a solution; the picket fence reactor concept had been developed as a solution to another problem, bremsstrahlung losses, but he pointed out that its field arrangement would be naturally stable under the conditions shown in the Kruskal/Schwarzschild paper. Nevertheless, as Amasa Bishop noted;

The suggestion of the picket-fence concept did little, however, to dispel the atmosphere of gloom which settled over the conference, toward its end. The stability criterion which had been suggested by Teller was admittedly tentative, but it seemed dismayingly reasonable; perhaps more important, it brought the whole of the Sherwood program face to face with a problem which threatened its very existence.

The correctness of the simplified model was then called into question and led to further study. The answer appeared at a follow-up meeting at Berkeley in February 1955, where Harold Grad of New York University, Conrad Longmire of Los Alamos and Edward A. Frieman of Princeton presented independent developments that all proved the effect to be real, and worse, should be expected at any beta, not just high beta. Further work at Los Alamos demonstrated that the effect should be seen in both the mirror and stellarator.

The effect is most obvious in the magnetic mirror device. The mirror has a field that runs along the open center of the cylinder and bundles together at the ends. In the center of the chamber the particles follow the lines and flow towards either end of the device. There, the increasing magnetic density causes them to "reflect", reversing direction and flowing back into the center again. Ideally, this will keep the plasma confined indefinitely, but even in theory there a critical angle between the particle trajectory and the axis of the mirror where particles can escape. Initial calculations showed that the loss rate through this process would be small enough to not be a concern.

In practice, all mirror machines demonstrated a loss rate far higher than these calculations suggested. The interchange instability was one of the major reasons for these losses. The mirror field has a cigar shape to it, with increasing curvature at the ends. When the plasma is located in its design location, the electrons and ions are roughly mixed. However, if the plasma is displaced, the non-uniform nature of the field means the ion's larger orbital radius takes them outside the confinement area while the electrons remain inside. It is possible the ion will hit the wall of the container, removing it from the plasma. If this occurs, the outer edge of the plasma is now net negatively charged, attracting more of the positively charged ions, which then escape as well.

This effect allows even a tiny displacement to drive the entire plasma mass to the walls of the container. The same effect occurs in any reactor design where the plasma is within a field of sufficient curvature, which includes the outside curve of toroidal machines like the tokamak and stellarator. As this process is highly non-linear, it tends to occur in isolated areas, giving rise to the flute-like expansions as opposed to mass movement of the plasma as a whole.

== History ==
In the 1950s, the field of theoretical plasma physics emerged. The confidential research of the war became declassified and allowed the publication and spread of very influential papers. The world rushed to take advantage of the recent revelations on nuclear energy. Although never fully realized, the idea of controlled thermonuclear fusion motivated many to explore and research novel configurations in plasma physics. Instabilities plagued early designs of artificial plasma confinement devices and were quickly studied partly as a means to inhibit the effects. The analytical equations for interchange instabilities were first studied by Kruskal and Schwarzschild in 1954. They investigated several simple systems including the system in which an ideal fluid is supported against gravity by a magnetic field (the initial model described in the last section).

In 1958, Bernstein derived an energy principle that rigorously proved that the change in potential must be greater than zero for a system to be stable. This energy principle has been essential in establishing a stability condition for the possible instabilities of a specific configuration.

In 1959, Thomas Gold attempted to use the concept of interchange motion to explain the circulation of plasma around the Earth, using data from Pioneer III published by James Van Allen. Gold also coined the term "magnetosphere" to describe "the region above the ionosphere in which the magnetic field of the Earth has a dominant control over the motions of gas and fast charged particles." Marshall Rosenthal and Conrad Longmire described in their 1957 paper how a flux tube in a planetary magnetic field accumulates charge because of opposing movement of the ions and electrons in the background plasma. Gradient, curvature and centrifugal drifts all send ions in the same direction along the planetary rotation, meaning that there is a positive build-up on one side of the flux tube and a negative build-up on the other. The separation of charges established an electric field across the flux tube and therefore adds an E x B motion, sending the flux tube toward the planet. This mechanism supports our interchange instability framework, resulting in the injection of less dense gas radially inward. Since Kruskal and Schwarzschild's papers a tremendous amount of theoretical work has been accomplished that handle multi-dimensional configurations, varying boundary conditions and complicated geometries.

Studies of planetary magnetospheres with space probes has helped the development of interchange instability theories, especially the comprehensive understanding of interchange motions in Jupiter and Saturn's magnetospheres.

== Instability in a plasma system ==
The single most important property of a plasma is its stability. MHD and its derived equilibrium equations offer a wide variety of plasmas configurations but the stability of those configurations have not been challenged. More specifically, the system must satisfy the simple condition

where ? is the change in potential energy for degrees of freedom. Failure to meet this condition indicates that there is a more energetically preferable state. The system will evolve and either shift into a different state or never reach a steady state. These instabilities pose great challenges to those aiming to make stable plasma configurations in the lab. However, they have also granted us an informative tool on the behavior of plasma, especially in the examination of planetary magnetospheres.

This process injects hotter, lower density plasma into a colder, higher density region. It is the MHD analog of the well-known Rayleigh-Taylor instability. The Rayleigh-Taylor instability occurs at an interface in which a lower density liquid pushes against a higher density liquid in a gravitational field. In a similar model with a gravitational field, the interchange instability acts in the same way. However, in planetary magnetospheres co-rotational forces are dominant and change the picture slightly.

=== Simple models ===
Let's first consider the simple model of a plasma supported by a magnetic field B in a uniform gravitational field g. To simplify matters, assume that the internal energy of the system is zero such that static equilibrium may be obtained from the balance of the gravitational force and the magnetic field pressure on the boundary of the plasma. The change in the potential is then given by the equation: ? If two adjacent flux tubes lying opposite along the boundary (one fluid tube and one magnetic flux tube) are interchanged the volume element doesn't change and the field lines are straight. Therefore, the magnetic potential doesn't change, but the gravitational potential changes since it was moved along the z axis. Since the change in is negative the potential is decreasing.

A decreasing potential indicates a more energetically favorable system and consequently an instability. The origin of this instability is in the J × B forces that occur at the boundary between the plasma and magnetic field. At this boundary there are slight ripple-like perturbations in which the low points must have a larger current than the high points since at the low point more gravity is being supported against the gravity. The difference in current allows negative and positive charge to build up along the opposite sides of the valley. The charge build-up produces an E field between the hill and the valley. The accompanying E × B drifts are in the same direction as the ripple, amplifying the effect. This is what is physically meant by the "interchange" motion.

These interchange motions also occur in plasmas that are in a system with a large centrifugal force. In a cylindrically symmetric plasma device, radial electric fields cause the plasma to rotate rapidly in a column around the axis. Acting opposite to the gravity in the simple model, the centrifugal force moves the plasma outward where the ripple-like perturbations (sometimes called "flute" instabilities) occur on the boundary. This is important for the study of the magnetosphere in which the co-rotational forces are stronger than the opposing gravity of the planet. Effectively, the less dense "bubbles" inject radially inward in this configuration.

Without gravity or an inertial force, interchange instabilities can still occur if the plasma is in a curved magnetic field. If we assume the potential energy to be purely magnetic then the change in potential energy is: . If the fluid is incompressible then the equation can be simplified into . Since (to maintain pressure balance), the above equation shows that if the system is unstable. Physically, this means that if the field lines are toward the region of higher plasma density then the system is susceptible to interchange motions. To derive a more rigorous stability condition, the perturbations that cause an instability must be generalized. The momentum equation for a resistive MHD is linearized and then manipulated into a linear force operator. Due to purely mathematical reasons, it is then possible to split the analysis into two approaches: the normal mode method and the energy method. The normal mode method essentially looks for the eigenmodes and eigenfrequencies and summing the solutions to form the general solution. The energy method is similar to the simpler approach outlined above where is found for any arbitrary perturbation in order to maintain the condition . These two methods are not exclusive and can be used together to establish a reliable diagnosis of the stability.

== Observations in space ==
The strongest evidence for interchange transport of plasma in any magnetosphere is the observation of injection events. The recording of these events in the magnetospheres of Earth, Jupiter and Saturn are the main tool for the interpretation and analysis of interchange motion.

=== Earth ===
Although spacecraft have travelled many times in the inner and outer orbit of Earth since the 1960s, the spacecraft ATS-5 was the first major plasma experiment performed that could reliably determine the existence of radial injections driven by interchange motions. The analysis revealed the frequent injection of a hot plasma cloud is injected inward during a substorm in the outer layers of the magnetosphere. The injections occur predominantly in the night-time hemisphere, being associated with the depolarization of the neutral sheet configuration in the tail regions of the magnetosphere. This paper then implies that Earth's magnetotail region is a major mechanism in which the magnetosphere stores and releases energy through the interchange mechanism. The interchange instability also has been found to have a limiting factor on the night side plasmapause thickness [Wolf et al. 1990]. In this paper, the plasmapause is found to be near the geosynchronous orbit in which the centrifugal and gravitational potential exactly cancel out. This sharp change in plasma pressure associated with the plasma pause enables this instability. A mathematical treatment comparing the growth rate of the instability with the thickness of the plasmapause boundary revealed that the interchange instability limits the thickness of that boundary.

=== Jupiter ===
Interchange instability plays a major role in the radial transport of plasma in the Io plasma torus at Jupiter. The first evidence of this behavior was published by Thorne et al. in which they discovered "anomalous plasma signatures" in the Io torus of Jupiter's magnetosphere. Using the data from the spacecraft Galileo's energetic particle detector (EPD), the study looked at one specific event. In Thorne et al. they concluded that these events had a density differential of at least a factor of 2, a spatial scale of km and an inward velocity of about km/s. These results support the theoretical arguments for interchange transport.

Later, more injections events were discovered and analyzed from Galileo. Mauk et al. used over 100 Jovian injections to study how these events were dispersed in energy and time. Similar to injections of Earth, the events were often clustered in time. The authors concluded that this indicated the injection events were triggered by solar wind activity against the Jovian magnetosphere. This is very similar to the magnetic storm relationship injection events have on Earth. However, it was found that Jovian injections can occur at all local time positions and therefore can't be directly related to the situation in Earth's magnetosphere. Although the Jovian injections aren't a direct analog of Earth's injections, the similarities indicate that this process plays a vital role in the storage and release of energy. The difference may lie in the presence of Io in the Jovian system. Io is a large producer of plasma mass because of its volcanic activity. This explains why the bulk of interchange motions are seen in a small radial range near Io.

=== Saturn ===
Recent evidence from the spacecraft Cassini has confirmed that the same interchange process is prominent on Saturn. Unlike Jupiter, the events happen much more frequently and more clearly. The difference lies in the configuration of the magnetosphere. Since Saturn's gravity is much weaker, the gradient/curvature drift for a given particle energy and L value is about 25 times faster. Saturn's magnetosphere provides a much better environment for the study of interchange instability under these conditions even though the process is essential in both Jupiter and Saturn. In a case study of one injection event, the Cassini Plasma Spectrometer (CAPS) produced characteristic radial profiles of plasma densities and temperatures of the plasma particles that also allowed the calculation of the origin of the injection and the radial propagation velocity. The electron density inside the event was lowered by a factor of about 3, the electron temperature was higher by an order of magnitude than the background, and there was a slight increase in the magnetic field. The study also used a model of pitch angle distributions to estimate the event originated between $9<L<11$ and had a radial speed of about 260+60/-70 km/s. These results are similar to the Galileo results discussed earlier. The similarities imply that the Saturn and Jupiter processes are the same.

== See also ==
- Plasma stability
- Magnetic mirror
- Fusion power
