= Toroidal solenoid =

1946 proposed fusion power device

toroidal solenoid
- Device type: toroidal
- Location: United Kingdom
- Affiliation: Imperial College London

History
- Related devices: ZETA

The toroidal solenoid was an early 1946 design for a fusion power device designed by George Paget Thomson and Moses Blackman of Imperial College London. It proposed to confine a deuterium fuel plasma to a toroidal (donut-shaped) chamber using magnets, and then heating it to fusion temperatures using radio frequency energy in the fashion of a microwave oven. It is notable for being the first such design to be patented, filing a secret patent on 8 May 1946 and receiving it in 1948. (Note: A patent on the Diffusion Inhibitor was apparently filed in 1941, but never granted.)

A critique by Rudolf Peierls noted several problems with the concept. Over the next few years, Thomson continued to suggest starting an experimental effort to study these issues, but was repeatedly denied as the underlying theory of plasma diffusion was not well developed. When similar concepts were suggested by Peter Thonemann that included a more practical heating arrangement, John Cockcroft began to take the concept more seriously, establishing small study groups at Harwell. Thomson adopted Thonemann's concept, abandoning the radio frequency system.

When the patent had still not been granted in early 1948, the Ministry of Supply inquired about Thomson's intentions. Thomson explained the problems he had getting a program started and that he did not want to hand off the rights until that was clarified. As the directors of the UK nuclear program, the Ministry quickly forced Harwell's hand to provide funding for Thomson's program. Thomson then released his rights the patent, which was granted late that year. Cockcroft also funded Thonemann's work, and with that, the UK fusion program began in earnest. After the news furor over the Huemul Project in February 1951, significant funding was released and led to rapid growth of the program in the early 1950s, and ultimately to the ZETA reactor of 1958.

== Conceptual development ==
The basic understanding of nuclear fusion was developed during the 1920s as physicists explored the new science of quantum mechanics. George Gamow's 1928 work on quantum tunnelling demonstrated that nuclear reactions could take place at lower energies than classical theory predicted. Using this theory, in 1929 Fritz Houtermans and Robert Atkinson demonstrated that expected reaction rates in the core of the Sun supported Arthur Eddington's 1920 suggestion that the Sun is powered by fusion.

In 1934, Mark Oliphant, Paul Harteck and Ernest Rutherford were the first to achieve fusion on Earth, using a particle accelerator to shoot deuterium nuclei into a metal foil containing deuterium, lithium or other elements. This allowed them to measure the nuclear cross section of various fusion reactions, and determined that the deuterium-deuterium reaction occurred at a lower energy than other reactions, peaking at about 100,000 electronvolts (100 keV).

This energy corresponds to the average energy of particles in a gas heated to a billion Kelvin. Materials heated beyond a few tens of thousand Kelvin dissociate into their electrons and nuclei, producing a gas-like state of matter known as plasma. In any gas the particles have a wide range of energies, normally following the Maxwell–Boltzmann statistics. In such a mixture, a small number of particles will have much higher energy than the bulk.

This leads to an interesting possibility; even at temperatures well below 100,000 eV, some particles will randomly have enough energy to undergo fusion. Those reactions release huge amounts of energy. If that energy can be captured back into the plasma, it can heat other particles to that energy as well, making the reaction self-sustaining. In 1944, Enrico Fermi calculated this would occur at about 50,000,000 K.

== Confinement ==
Taking advantage of this possibility requires the fuel plasma to be held together long enough that these random reactions have time to occur. Like any hot gas, the plasma has an internal pressure and thus tends to expand according to the ideal gas law. For a fusion reactor, the problem is keeping the plasma contained against this pressure; any known physical container would melt at temperatures in the thousands of Kelvin, far below the millions needed for fusion.

A plasma is electrically conductive, and is subject to electric and magnetic fields. In a magnetic field, the electrons and nuclei orbit the magnetic field lines. A simple confinement system is a plasma-filled tube placed inside the open core of a solenoid. The plasma naturally wants to expand outwards to the walls of the tube, as well as move along it, towards the ends. The solenoid creates a magnetic field running down the centre of the tube, which the particles will orbit, preventing their motion towards the sides. Unfortunately, this arrangement does not confine the plasma along the length of the tube, and the plasma is free to flow out the ends.

== Initial design ==
The obvious solution to this problem is to bend the tube, and solenoid, around to form a torus (a ring or doughnut shape). Motion towards the sides remains constrained as before, and while the particles remain free to move along the lines, in this case, they will simply circulate around the long axis of the tube. But, as Fermi pointed out, (Note: Andrei Sakharov came to the same conclusion as Fermi in 1950, but his paper on the topic was not known in the West until 1958.) when the solenoid is bent into a ring, the electrical windings of the solenoid would be closer together on the inside than the outside. This would lead to an uneven field across the tube, and the fuel will slowly drift out of the centre. Some additional force needs to counteract this drift, providing long-term confinement.

Thomson began development of his concept in February 1946. He noted that this arrangement caused the positively charged fuel ions to drift outward more rapidly than the negatively charged electrons. This would result in a negative area in the center of the chamber that would develop over a short period. This net negative charge would then produce an attractive force on the ions, keeping them from drifting too far from the center, and thus preventing them from drifting to the walls. It appeared this could provide long-term confinement.

This leaves the issue of how to heat the fuel to the required temperatures. Thomson proposed injecting a cool plasma into the torus and then heating it with radio frequency signals beamed into the chamber. The electrons in the plasma would be "pumped" by this energy, transferring it to the ions though collisions. If the chamber held a plasma with densities on the order of 10^{14} to 10^{15} nuclei/cm^{3}, it would take several minutes to reach the required temperatures.

== Filing a patent ==
In early March, Thomson sent a copy of his proposal to Rudolf Peierls, then at the University of Birmingham. Peierls immediately pointed out a concern; both Peierls and Thomson had been to meetings at the Los Alamos in 1944 where Edward Teller held several informal talks, including the one in which Fermi outlined the basic conditions needed for fusion. This was in the context of an H-bomb, or "the super" as it was then known. Peierls noted that the US might claim priority on such information and consider it highly secret, which meant that while Thomson was privy to the information, it was unlikely others at Imperial were.

Considering the problem, Thomson decided to attempt to file a patent on the concept. This would ensure the origins of the concepts would be recorded, and prove that the ideas were due to efforts in the UK and not his previous work on the atom bomb. At the time, Thomson was not concerned with establishing personal priority for the concept nor generating income from it. At his suggestion, on 26 March 1946 they met with Arthur Block of the Ministry of Supply (MoS), which led to B.L. Russel, the MoS' patent agent, beginning to write a patent application that would be owned entirely by the government.

== Peierls' concerns ==
Peierls then followed up with a lengthy critique of the concept, noting three significant issues.

The major concern was that the system as a whole used a toroidal field to confine the electrons, and the electric field resulting to confine the ions. Peierls pointed out that this "cross field" would cause the particles to be forced across the magnetic lines due to the right hand rule, causing the electrons to orbit around the chamber in the poloidal direction, eliminating the area of increased electrons in the center, and thereby allowing the ions to drift to the walls. Using Thomson's own figures for the conditions in an operating reactor, Peierls demonstrated that the resulting neutralized region would extend all the way to the walls, by less than the radius of the electrons in the field. There would be no confinement of the ions.

He also included two additional concerns. One involved the issue of the deuterium fuel ions impacting with the walls of the chamber and the effects that would have, and the other that having electrons leave the plasma would cause an ion to be forced out to maintain charge balance, which would quickly "clean up" all of the gas in the chamber. (Note: This effect would be seen in a number of later designs, where it was known as "pump out".)

== Pinch emerges ==
Thomson was not terribly concerned about the two minor problems but accepted that the primary one about the crossed fields was a serious issue. Considering the issue, a week later he wrote back with a modified concept. In this version, the external magnets producing the toroidal field were removed, and confinement was instead provided by running a current through the plasma. He proposed inducing this current using radio signals injected through slots cut into the torus at spaces that would create a wave moving around the torus similar to the system used in linear accelerators used to accelerate electrons.

A provisional patent was filed on 8 May 1946, updated to use the new confinement system. In the patent, Thomson noted that the primary problem would be overcoming energy losses through bremsstrahlung. He calculated that a plasma density of 10^{15} would remain stable long enough for the energy of the pumped electrons to heat the D fuel to the required 100 keV over the time of several minutes. Although the term "pinch effect" is not mentioned, except for the current generation concept, the description was similar to the pinch machines that would become widespread in the 1950s.

== Further criticism ==
Thomson was then sent to New York City as part of the British delegation to the United Nations Atomic Energy Commission and did not return until late in the year. After he returned, in January 1947, John Cockcroft called a meeting at Harwell to discuss his ideas with a group including Peierls, Moon and Sayers from Birmingham University, Tuck from the Clarendon Laboratory at Oxford University, and Skinner, Frisch, Fuchs, French and Bretscher from Harwell.

Thomson described his concept, including several possible ways to drive the current. Peierls reiterated his earlier concerns, mentioning the observations by Mark Oliphant and Harrie Massey who had worked with David Bohm on isotopic separation at Berkeley. Bohm had observed greatly increased rates of diffusion well beyond what classical diffusion would suggest, today known as Bohm diffusion. If this was inherent to such designs, Peierls suggested there was no way the device would work. He then added a highly prescient statement that there may be further unknown instabilities that would ruin confinement.

Peierls concluded by suggesting initial studies on the pinch effect be carried out by Moon in Birmingham, where Moon had some experience in these sorts of devices and especially because Sayers was already planning experiments with powerful spark discharges in deuterium. There is no record that this work was carried out, although theoretical studies on the behaviour of plasma in a pinch was worked on.

== Early experiments ==
The main outcome of the meeting was to introduce Thomson to the wirbelrohr, a new type of particle accelerator built in 1944 in Germany. The wirbelrohr used a cyclotron-like arrangement to accelerate the electrons in a plasma, which its designer, Max Steenbeck, believed would cause them to "break away" from the ions and accelerate to very high speeds. The parallels between this device and Thomson's concept were obvious, but Steenbeck's acceleration mechanism was novel and presented a potentially more efficient heating system.

When he returned to London after the meeting, Thomson had two PhD students put on the project, with Alan Ware tasked with building a wirbelrohr and Stanley Cousins starting a mathematical study on diffusion of plasma in a magnetic field. Ware build a device using 3 cm tube bent around into a 25 cm wide torus. Using a wide variety of gas pressures and currents up to 13,000 Amps, Ware was able to show some evidence of the pinching of the plasma, but failed, as had the Germans, to find any evidence of the break away electrons. With this limited success, Ware and Cousins built a second device at 40 cm and up to 27,000 Amps. Once again, no evidence of electron break away was seen, but this time a new high-speed rotating-mirror camera was able to directly image the plasma during the discharge and was able to conclusively show the plasma was indeed being pinched.

== Classification concerns ==
While Cousins and Ware began their work, in April 1947 Thomson filed a more complete patent application. This described a larger 4 metres (13 ft) wide torus with many ports for injecting and removing gas and to inject the radio frequency energy to drive the current. The entire system was then placed within a large magnet that produced a moderate 0.15 T vertical magnetic field across the entire torus, which kept the electrons confined. He predicted that a power input of 1.9 MW would be needed and calculated that the D-D and D-T reactions would generate 9 MW of fusion energy, of which 1.9 MW was in the form of neutrons. He suggested that the neutrons could be used as a power source, but also if the system was surrounded by natural uranium, mostly ^{238}U, the neutrons would transmute it into plutonium-239, a major component of atomic bombs.

It was this last part that raised new concerns. If, as Thomson described, one could make a relatively simple device that could produce plutonium there was an obvious nuclear security concern and such work would need to be secret. Neither Thomson or Harwell were happy performing secret work at the university. Considering the problem, Thomson suggested moving this work to RAF Aldermaston. Associated Electrical Industries (AEI) was outgrowing their existing labs in Rugby and Trafford Park, and had already suggested building a new secure lab at Aldermaston. AEI was looking to break into the emerging nuclear power field, and its director of research, Thomas Allibone, was a friend of Thomson's. Allibone strongly supported Thomson's suggestion, and further backing was received from Nobel winner James Chadwick. Cockcroft, on the other hand, believed it was too early to start the large program Thomson was suggesting, and continued to delay.

== Thonemann's concept ==
Around the same time, Cockcroft learned of similar work carried out independently by Peter Thonemann at Clarendon, triggering a small theoretical program at Harwell to consider it. But all suggestions of a larger development program continued to be rejected.

Thonemann's concept was to replace the radio frequency injection used by Thonemann and arrange the reactor like a betatron, that is, wrapping the torus in a large magnet and using its field to induce a current in the torus in a fashion similar to an electrical transformer. Betatrons had a natural limitation that the number of electrons in them was limited due to their self-repulsion, known as the space charge limit. Some had suggested introducing a gas to the chamber; when ionized by the accelerated electrons, the leftover ions would produce a positive charge that would help neutralize the chamber as a whole. Experiments to this end instead showed that collisions between the electrons and ions would scatter so rapidly that the number of electrons remaining was actually lower than before. This effect, however, was precisely what was desired in a fusion reactor, where the collisions would heat the deuterium ions.

At an accidental meeting at Clarendon, Thonemann ended up describing his idea to Thomson. Thonemann was not aware he was talking to Thomson, nor of Thomson's work on similar ideas. Thomson followed up with Skinner, who strongly supported Thonemann's concept over Thomson's. Skinner then wrote a paper on the topic, "Thermonuclear Reactions by Electrical Means", and presented it to the Atomic Energy Commission on 8 April 1948. He clearly pointed out where the unknowns were in the concepts, and especially the possibility of destructive instabilities that would ruin confinement. He concluded that it would be "useless to do much further planning" before further study on the instability issues.

It was at this point that a curious bit of legality comes into the events. In February 1948, Thompson's original patent filing had not been granted as the Ministry of Supply was not sure about his intentions on assigning the rights. Blackman was ill with malaria in South Africa, and the issue was put off for a time. It was raised again in May when he returned, resulting in a mid-July meeting. Thompson complained that Harwell was not supporting their efforts, and that as none of this was classified, he wanted to remain open to turning to private funding. In that case, he was hesitant to assign the rights to the Ministry. The Ministry, who was in charge of the nuclear labs including Harwell, quickly arranged for Cockroft to fund Thompson's development program. The program was approved in November, and the patent was assigned to the Ministry by the end of the year.

== Move to AEI ==
The work on fusion at Harwell and Imperial remained relatively low-level until 1951, when two events occurred that changed the nature of the program significantly.

The first was the January 1950 confession by Klaus Fuchs that he had been passing atomic information to the Soviets. His confession led to immediate and sweeping classification of almost anything nuclear related. This included all fusion related work, as the previous fears about the possibility of using fusion as a neutron source to produce plutonium now seemed like a serious issue. The earlier plans to move the team from Imperial were put into effect immediately, with the AEI labs being set up at the former Aldermaston and opening in April. This lab soon became the Atomic Weapons Research Establishment.

The second was the February 1951 announcement that Argentina had successfully produced fusion in its Huemul Project. Physicists around the world quickly dismissed it as impossible, which was revealed to be the case by 1952. However, it also had the effect of making politicians learn of the concept of fusion, and its potential as an energy source. Physicists working on the concept suddenly found themselves able to talk to high-ranking politicians, who proved rather receptive to increasing their budgets. Within weeks, programs in the US, UK and USSR were seeing dramatic expansion.

By the summer of 1952, the UK fusion program was developing several machines based on Thonemann's overall design, and Thomson's original RF-concept was put aside.
