= Biconic cusp =

Device for plasma confinement

The biconic cusp, also known as the picket fence reactor, was one of the earliest suggestions for plasma confinement in a fusion reactor. It consists of two parallel electromagnets with the current running in opposite directions, creating oppositely directed magnetic fields. The two fields interact to form a "null area" between them where the fusion fuel can be trapped.

The concept arose as a reaction to an issue raised by Edward Teller in 1953. Teller noted that any design that had the plasma held on the inside of concave magnetic fields would be naturally unstable. The cusp concept had fields that were convex, and the plasma was held within an area of little or no field in the inside of the device. The concept was independently presented in 1954 by both Harold Grad at the Courant Institute in New York and James L. Tuck at Los Alamos.

At first, there was little interest in the design because Teller's problem was not being seen in other early fusion machines. By the late 1950s, it was clear these machines all had serious problems, and Teller's was only one of many. This led to renewed interest in the cusp, and several machines were built to test the concept through the early 1960s. All of these devices leaked their fuel plasma at rates much greater than predicted and most work on the concept ended by the mid-1960s. Mikhail Ioffe later demonstrated why these problems arose.

A later device that shares some design with the cusp is the polywell concept of the 1990s. This can be thought of as multiple cusps arranged in three dimensions.

== History ==
=== Early development ===
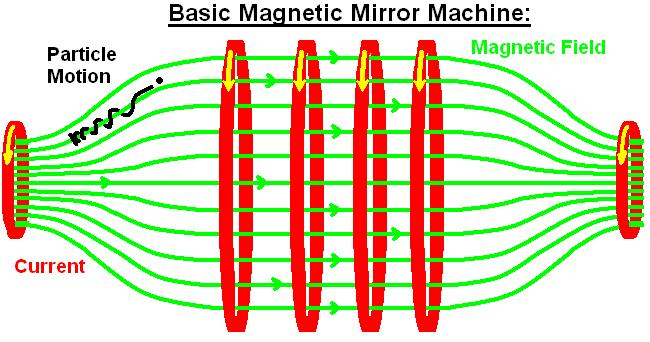
The magnetic mirror is an example of a device with concave fields. This sort of "bad curvature" leads to the plasma being ejected outward in these areas, near the captions like "particle motion".

In 1953, at a now-famous but then-secret meeting, Edward Teller raised the theoretical issue of the flute instability. This suggested that any fusion machine that confined the plasma on the inside of a curved field, as opposed to the outside of the curvature, would be naturally unstable and rapidly eject its plasma. This sort of "bad curvature" was part of almost all designs of the era, including the z-pinch, the stellarator and the magnetic mirrors. All of these designs had curves with the plasma on the inside of concave fields and was expected to be unstable.

At the time, the very early machines being built did not show evidence of this problem, but were too small to conclusively show it anyway. Other instabilities were being seen, some very serious, but the flute was just not appearing. Nevertheless, a number of researchers began considering new concepts that did not use this sort of field arrangement and would thus be naturally stable. The cusp concept was independently developed in 1954 by James L. Tuck at Los Alamos and Harold Grad at New York University. Tuck's design differed from Grad's largely in that it consisted of a series of cusps placed in a line. A single-cusp version was seen as a simpler device to test the concept, and a magnet assembly for one such machine was built at Los Alamos.

Calculations at Los Alamos noted that the plasma would escape the reactor because the magnetic lines were "open" and ions following a certain trajectory would be free to leave the core. This meant the picket fence would lose plasma at a fast rate, no matter how stable it was, and it would not be useful as a power-producing reactor. Despite this, it could still be useful for experimental purposes if it retained its plasma longer than unstable devices, giving them time to perform measurements that might be impossible in other devices. Grad's work found another solution; although the plasma leakage was fast at low density, at higher density the self-repulsion between the ions and electrons would trap it for much longer times. There appeared to be several ways this might be accomplished.

Before the system was considered further, results from newer versions of the other designs all seemed to be suggesting Teller's issue was simply not being seen, or was at least far below predictions. Among them, the pinch concept had been demonstrating serious problems, but Tuck and others had continued studying the system and were introducing new solutions. The resulting "stabilized pinch" appeared to solve the stability problems and a new series of much larger pinch machines began to be built, headlined by the ZETA reactor in the UK. Interest in the cusp declined as the other approaches appeared to be on the brink of producing fusion. Los Alamos' magnet assembly was placed in storage. Grad's group had also largely abandoned the concept by late 1956.

=== Renewed interest ===
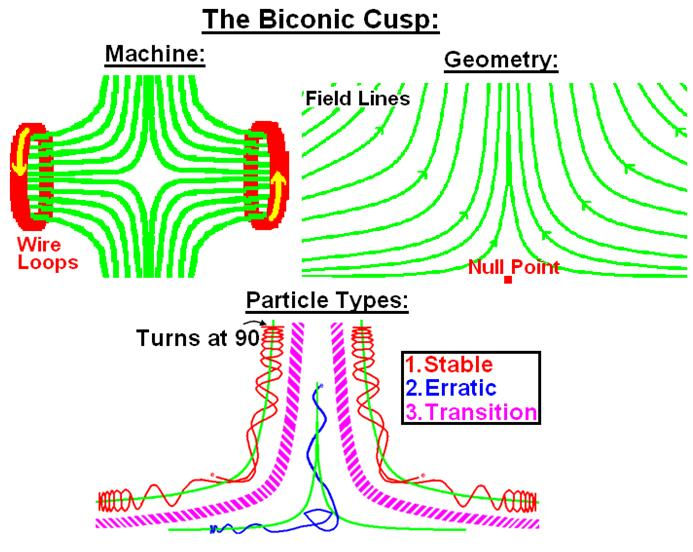
Biconic cusps arrange their fields so that the plasma is not restrained in concave fields and avoids the flute instability.

In early 1958, the British announced ZETA had produced fusion. Months later, they were forced to publish a retraction, noting that the neutrons they saw were not from fusion events, but a new type of instability that had not been previously seen. Over the next year, similar problems were seen in all of the designs and the illusion of progress was shattered.

As the problems were being studied, the original work on the cusp design was reconsidered. The power supply for the early machine at Los Alamos had been sitting in a warehouse for years, and was then taken out of storage and used to build the single-cusp Picket Fence I. Its simplicity meant similar systems were built at General Atomics, Livermore, Harwell, the University of Utrecht and the Kharkov Institute, the Stevens Institute of Technology, and others.

By 1960, Picket Fence had overcome a number of early problems. Initial results measuring the light being emitted by the hot plasma suggested it was stable for up to 1 millisecond, but further diagnostics demonstrated this was only a few microseconds and the light was the result of a sort of afterglow. Improvements in the device resulted in significant gains, and plasma confinement improved to about 50 microseconds, but this was still far less than desired.

== Description ==
The magnetic fields in this system were made by electromagnets placed close together. This was a theoretical construct used to model how to contain plasma. The fields were made by two coils of wire facing one another. These electromagnets had poles which faced one another and in the center was a null point in the magnetic field. This was also termed a zero point field. These devices were explored theoretically by Dr. Harold Grad at NYU's Courant Institute in the late 1950s and early 1960s. Because the fields were planar symmetric this plasma system was simple to model.

== Particle behavior ==
Simulations of these geometries revealed the existence of three classes of particles. The first class moved back and forth far away from the null point. These particles would be reflected close to the poles of the electromagnets and the plane cusp in the center. This reflection was due to the magnetic mirror effect. These are very stable particles, but their motion changes as they radiate energy over time. This radiation loss arose from acceleration or deceleration by the field and can be calculated using the Larmor formula. The second particle moved close to the null point in the center. Because particles passed through locations with no magnetic field, their motions could be straight, with an infinite gyroradius. This straight motion caused the particle to make a more erratic path through the fields. The third class of particles was a transition between these types. Biconic cusps were recently revived because of its similar geometry to the Polywell fusion reactor.
