= Sherwood conferences =

The Sherwood Conferences were a series of classified conferences that were held between 1952 and 1958 in the United States. These conferences were a part of the United States controlled nuclear program called Project Sherwood. These conferences were established in order to entice experienced personnel to join the newly developed Project Sherwood. There were three different plasma confinement designs that were being researched in three different locations: the stellarator at Princeton Plasma Physics Laboratory, the toroidal pinch at Los Alamos National Laboratory, and the magnetic mirror at the Livermore National Laboratory. Because these individual projects operated in separate facilities, these conferences were helpful to strengthen communication of information between all three projects.

== The First Conference ==
The first Sherwood conference was organized by the AEC director of the Division of Research, Thomas Johnson. The conference was held at the University of Denver in Denver, Colorado on June 28, 1952. To attract more experienced personnel, workers already participating on the projects attended the conference. Overall, there were about eighty scientists that attended the first conference.

== Dates and Locations of the Sherwood Conferences ==
Date	Location
June 28, 1952	University of Denver, Denver, Colorado
April 7, 1953	University of California, Berkeley, California
June 24, 1954	Los Alamos, New Mexico
October 26–27, 1954	Princeton University, Princeton, New Jersey
February 7–9, 1955	University of California Radiation Laboratory, Livermore, California
June 10–11, 1955	Los Alamos, New Mexico
October 17–20, 1955	Princeton University, Princeton, New Jersey
June 4–7, 1956	Gatlinburg, Tennessee
February 20–23, 1957	Berkeley, California
October 17–18, 1957	Princeton, New Jersey
February 3–6, 1958	Washington, D.C.

== See also ==
- Project Sherwood
- Timeline of nuclear fusion
