= Sceptre (fusion reactor) =

Type of fusion power device

Coordinates: 51°22′09.3″N 1°08′25.9″W

Sceptre (stabilized controlled pinch thermonuclear reactor experiment) was a series of early fusion power devices based on the Z-pinch concept of plasma confinement, built in the UK starting in 1956. They were the ultimate versions of a series of devices tracing their history to the original pinch machines, built at Imperial College London by Cousins and Ware in 1947. When the UK's fusion work was classified in 1950, Ware's team was moved to the Associated Electrical Industries (AEI) labs at the Atomic Weapons Establishment (AWE, Aldermaston).

The team worked on small linear tubes like the ones that were known to be used in the Soviet Union, but these demonstrated problems and work on these ended. They then turned their attention to the problems associated with using metal tubes with high voltages, in support of the efforts at Harwell. As part of this AEI built a 64-segment metal tube that could be connected together in various ways to conduct experiments.

Following this, they were eventually allowed to make several smaller toroidal devices, similar to those at Harwell, as purely experimental devices. When Harwell's ZETA machine emitted seeming fusion neutrons, AEI quickly built a smaller machine out of parts of the earlier metal-liner testbed, producing Sceptre III. Sceptre III also emitted neutrons, seeming to confirm the ZETA results. It was later found that the neutrons were spurious, and UK work on Z-pinch ended in the early 1960s.

== History ==
=== Background ===
Fusion research in the UK started on a shoestring budget at Imperial College in 1946. When George Paget Thomson failed to gain funding from John Cockcroft's Atomic Energy Research Establishment (AERE), he turned over the project to two students, Stanley (Stan) W. Cousins and Alan Alfred Ware (1924-2010). They started working on the concept in January 1947, using a glass tube and old radar parts. Their small experimental device was able to generate brief flashes of light, but the nature of the light remained a mystery as they could not come up with a method of measuring its temperature.

Little interest was shown in the work, although it was noticed by Jim Tuck, who was interested in all things related to fusion. He met fellow fusion-fascinated Peter Thonemann, and the two developed a similar small machine of their own at Oxford University's Clarendon Laboratory. Tuck left for the University of Chicago before the device was built. After moving to Los Alamos, Tuck introduced the pinch concept there, and eventually built the Perhapsatron along the same lines.

In early 1950 Klaus Fuchs' admitted to turning UK and US atomic secrets over to the USSR. As fusion devices would generate copious amounts of neutrons, which could be used to enrich nuclear fuel for atomic bombs, the UK immediately classified all their fusion work. The research was considered important enough to continue, but it was difficult to maintain secrecy in a university setting. The decision was made to move both teams to secure locations. Imperial team under Ware was set up at the new Associated Electrical Industries (AEI) labs at Aldermaston in November while the Oxford team under Thonemann were moved to UKAEA Harwell.

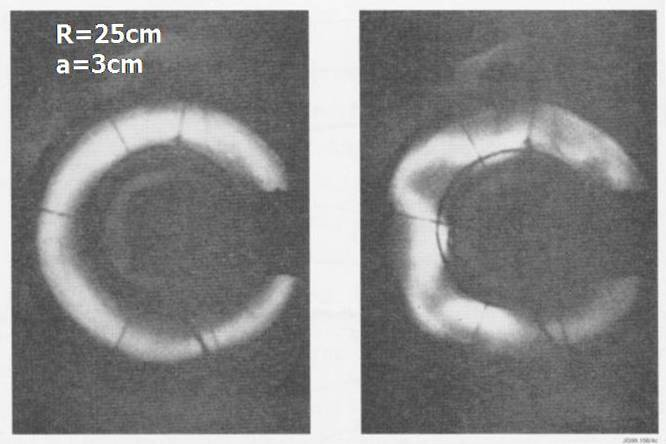
Perhaps the earliest photograph of the kink instability in action - the 3 by 25 pyrex tube at Aldermaston.

By 1951 there were numerous pinch devices in operation; Cousins and Ware had built several follow-on machines, Tuck built his Perhapsatron, and another team at Los Alamos built a linear machine known as Columbus. It was later learned that Fuchs had passed information about the early UK work to the Soviets, and they had started a pinch program as well.

By 1952 it was clear to everyone that something was wrong in the machines. As current was applied, the plasma would first pinch down as expected, but would then develop a series of "kinks", evolving into a sinusoidal shape. When the outer portions hit the walls of the container, a small amount of the material would spall off into the plasma, cooling it and ruining the reaction. This so-called "kink instability" appeared to be a fundamental problem.

=== Practical work ===
At Aldermaston, the Imperial team was put under the direction of Thomas Allibone. Compared to the team at Harwell, the Aldermaston team decided to focus on faster pinch systems. Their power supply consisted of a large bank of capacitors with a total capacity of 66,000 Joules (when fully expanded) switched by spark gaps that could dump the stored power into the system at high speeds. Harwell's devices used slower rising pinch currents, and had to be larger to reach the same conditions.

One early suggestion to solve the kink instability was to use highly conductive metal tubes for the vacuum chamber instead of glass. As the plasma approached the walls of the tube, the moving current would induce a magnetic field in the metal. This field would, due to Lenz's law, opposed the motion of the plasma toward it, hopefully slowing or stopping its approach to the sides of the container. Tuck referred to this concept as "giving the plasma a backbone".

Allibone, originally from Metropolitan-Vickers, had worked on metal-walled X-ray tubes that used small inserts of porcelain to insulate them electrically. He suggested trying the same thing for the fusion experiments, potentially leading to higher temperatures than the glass tubes could handle. They started with an all-porcelain tube of 20 cm major axis, and were able to induce 30 kA of current into the plasma before it broke up. Following this they built an aluminum version, which was split into two parts with mica inserts between them. This version suffered arcing between the two halves.

Convinced that the metal tube was the way ahead, the team then started a long series of experiments with different materials and construction techniques to solve the arcing problem. By 1955 they had developed one with 64 segments that showed promise, and using 60 kJ capacitor bank they were able to induce 80 kA discharges. Although the tube was an improvement, it also suffered from the same kink instabilities, and work on this approach was abandoned.

To better characterize the problem, the team started construction of a larger aluminum torus with a 12-inch bore and 45 inch diameter, and inserted two straight sections to stretch it into a racetrack shape. The straight sections, known as the "pepper pot", had a series of holes drilled in them, angled so they all pointed to a single focal point some distance from the apparatus. A camera placed at the focal point was able to image the entire plasma column, greatly improving their understanding of the instability process.

Studying the issue, Shavranov, Taylor and Rosenbluth all developed the idea of adding a second magnetic field to the system, a steady-state toroidal field generated by magnets circling the vacuum tube. The second field would force the electrons and deuterons in the plasma to orbit the lines of force, reducing the effects of small imperfections in the field generated by the pinch itself. This sparked off considerable interest in both the US and UK. Thomson, armed with the possibility of a workable device and obvious interest in the US, won approval for a very large machine, ZETA.

=== Sceptre ===
At Aldermaston, using the same information, Ware's team calculated that with the 60 kJ available in the existing capacitor bank, they would reach the required conditions in a copper-covered quartz tube 2 inches in bore and 10 inches in diameter, or an all-copper version 2 inches in bore and 18 inches across. Work on both started in parallel, as Sceptre I and II.

However, before either was completed, the ZETA team at Harwell had already achieved stable plasmas in August 1957. The Aldermaston team raced to complete their larger photographic system. Electrical arcing and shorting between the tube segments became a problem, but the team had already learned that "dry firing" the apparatus hundreds of times would reduce this effect. After addressing the arcing, further experiments demonstrated temperatures around 1 million degrees. The system worked as expected, producing clear images of the kink instabilities using high-speed photography and argon gas so as to produce a bright image.

The team then removed the straight sections, added stabilization magnets, and re-christened the machine Sceptre III. In December they started experimental runs like those on ZETA. By measuring the spectral lines of oxygen, they calculated interior temperatures of 2 to 3.5 million degrees. Photographs through a slit in the side showed the plasma column remaining stable for 300 to 400 microseconds, a dramatic improvement on previous efforts. Working backward, the team calculated that the plasma had an electrical resistivity around 100 times that of copper, and was able to carry 200 kA of current for 500 microseconds in total. When the current was over 70 kA, neutrons were observed in roughly the same numbers as ZETA.

As in the case of ZETA, it was soon learned that the neutrons were being produced by a spurious source, and the temperatures were due to turbulence in the plasma, not the average temperature.

=== Sceptre IV ===
As the ZETA debacle played out in 1958, solutions to the problems seen in ZETA and Sceptre IIIA were hoped to be simple: a better tube, higher vacuum, and denser plasma. As the Sceptre machine was much less expensive and the high-power capacitor bank already existed, the decision was made to test these concepts with a new device, Sceptre IV.

However, none of these techniques helped. Sceptre IV proved to have the same performance problems as the earlier machines. Sceptre IV proved to be the last major "classic" pinch device built in the UK.
