= Amasa Stone Bishop =

American nuclear physicist

- Bishop c. 1958
- Born: 1921; Cleveland, Ohio, U.S.
- Died: May 21, 1997 (aged 75–76); Genolier, Switzerland
- Education: California Institute of Technology; University of California, Berkeley
- Awards: AEC Outstanding Service Award
- Scientific career
- Fields: Physics

Amasa Stone Bishop (1921 – May 21, 1997) was an American nuclear physicist specializing in fusion physics. He received his B.S. in physics from the California Institute of Technology in 1943. From 1943 to 1946 he was a member of the staff of Radiation Laboratory at the Massachusetts Institute of Technology, where he was involved with radar research and development. Later, he became a staff member of the University of California at Berkeley from 1946 to 1950. Specializing in high energy particle work, he earned his Ph.D. in physics in 1950.

After attaining his Ph.D., Amasa spent three years in Switzerland, acting as research associate at the Federal Institute of Technology in Zürich, and later at the University of Zürich. In 1953 Amasa joined the research division of the Atomic Energy Commission (AEC) in Washington and became the director of the American program to develop controlled fusion, also known as Project Sherwood. He was later presented the AEC Outstanding Service Award for his work. After leaving this position in 1956, Amasa published a book on behalf of the AEC discussing the various attempts at harnessing fusion under Project Sherwood. The book, "Project Sherwood: The U.S. Program in Controlled Fusion", was published in 1958.

After 1956 Amasa also served as the AEC's European scientific representative, based in Paris. He was also an assistant delegate to the European atomic energy agency, Euratom, in Brussels. Later he spent several years in Princeton, New Jersey, and was in charge of the fusion program in Washington.

In 1970 Amasa joined the United Nations in Europe as director of environment of the United Nations Economic Commission for Europe. During this position, he worked with scientists and diplomats to create solutions for various environmental problems. He left this position to retire in 1980. Amasa died on May 21, 1997, of pneumonia related to Alzheimer's disease at the Clinique de Genolier in Genolier, Switzerland.

Bishop was the great-grandson of Industrialist Amasa Stone.

== See also ==
- Timeline of nuclear fusion
