= Project Sherwood =

Early US program in nuclear fusion

Project Sherwood was the codename for a United States program in controlled nuclear fusion during the period it was classified. After 1958, when fusion research was declassified around the world, the project was reorganized as a separate division within the United States Atomic Energy Commission (AEC) and lost its codename.

Sherwood developed out of a number of ad hoc efforts dating back to about 1951. Primary among these was the stellarator program at Princeton University, itself code-named Project Matterhorn. Since then the weapons labs had clamored to join the club, Los Alamos with its z-pinch efforts, Livermore's magnetic mirror program, and later, Oak Ridge's fuel injector efforts. By 1953 the combined budgets were increasing into the million dollar range, demanding some sort of oversight at the AEC level.

The name "Sherwood" was suggested by Paul McDaniel, Deputy Director of the AEC. He noted that funding for the wartime Hood Building at MIT for Project Lincoln was being dropped and moved to the new program, so they were "robbing Hood to pay Friar Tuck", punning on the name of the British physicist and fusion researcher James L. Tuck and the popular phrase "to rob Peter to pay Paul". The connection to Robin Hood and Friar Tuck gave the project its name.

Lewis Strauss strongly supported keeping the program secret until pressure from the United Kingdom led to a declassification effort at the 2nd Atoms for Peace meeting in the fall of 1958. After this time a number of purely civilian organizations also formed to organize meetings on the topic, with the American Physical Society organizing meetings under their Division of Plasma Physics. These meetings have been carried on to this day and were renamed International Sherwood Fusion Theory Conference. The original Project Sherwood became simply the Controlled Thermonuclear Research program within the AEC and its follow-on organizations.

== Designs and concepts ==
Research centered on three plasma confinement designs; the stellarator headed by Lyman Spitzer at the Princeton Plasma Physics Laboratory, the toroidal pinch or Perhapsatron led by James Tuck at the Los Alamos National Laboratory and the magnetic mirror devices at the Livermore National Laboratory led by Richard F. Post. By June, 1954 a preliminary study had been completed for a full scale "Model D" stellarator that would be over 500 feet (150 m) long and produce 5,000 MW of electricity at a capital cost of $209 per kilowatt. However, each concept encountered unanticipated problems, in the form of plasma instabilities that prevented the requisite temperatures and pressures from being achieved, and it eventually became clear that sustained hydrogen fusion would not be developed quickly. Strauss left AEC in 1958 and his successor did not share Strauss' enthusiasm for fusion research. Consequently, Project Sherwood was relegated from a crash program to one that concentrated on basic research.

== Budget ==
The funding for Project Sherwood began with the closure of another program called Project Lincoln at the Hood Laboratory. As the number of people working on the projects grew, so did the budget. Under Strauss the program was reorganized, and its funding and staffing increased dramatically. From early 1954 to 1955, the number of people working on Project Sherwood grew from 45 to 110. By the next year, that number had doubled. The original budget from the shut down of Project Lincoln was $1 million. The breakdown of the year budget from 1951 to 1957 can be seen in the table below. At its peak, Project Sherwood had a budget of $23 million per year and retained more than 500 scientists.

Year of Project	Budget
1951-1953	$1 million
1954	$1.7 million
1955	$4.7 million
1956	$6.7 million
1957	$10.7 million

== Declassification of Project Sherwood ==
The declassification of the program was a large topic of discussion between scientists at all of the laboratories involved with the project and at the Sherwood conferences. The reasoning for an initial high classification status was that if the research into controlled fusion were to be successful then it would be a significant advantage in regards to military aspects. In particular, fusion products high-energy neutrons which could be used to enrich uranium into plutonium for nuclear bomb production. If a small fusion machine was possible, this represented a significant proliferation risk.

However, as the difficulty in making a working fusion reactor became increasingly clear, fears of hidden reactors faded. Additionally, while some of the required industrial work could be conducted without access to the classified information, there were some instances where the classified information of the program was a necessity for those people working on projects such as the large-scale stellarator, the ultra-high vacuum, and the problem of energy storage. In these instances, there was a contract with the Commission that the information that was being used would only be shared with the personnel that was directly working on the project. It soon became apparent that industrial companies were expected to become highly invested in the area of fission and because of this it became clear that these companies should have full access to the research information obtained by Project Sherwood. In June 1956, permits for the research information from Project Sherwood became available through the Commission for companies that were qualified.

Between 1955 and 1958, information became more and more available to the public with its gradual declassification beginning with the sharing of information with the United Kingdom. Huge supporters of declassification of the program included the director of the Division of Research, Thomas Johnson, and a member of his staff, Amasa Bishop. Some of their reasoning for wanting declassification was that the secrecy of the project could negatively impact their ability to enlist and employ experienced personnel to the program. The also argued that it would change the way their conferences could be held. The scientists working on the project would be able to freely discuss their findings with others in the scientific community rather than only the scientists working on the same project.

In 1956, Soviet physicist Igor Kurchatov gave a talk in the UK where he revealed the entire Soviet fusion program and detailed the problems they were having. Now that the very group of people the classification was intended to keep in the dark were at roughly the same stage of development, there was no obvious reason to continue classification. While the UK had been among the first to classify their program in the aftermath of the Klaus Fuchs affair in 1950, in the summer of 1957 they appeared to have successfully created fusion in their new ZETA and were clamoring to tell the press of their advances. Their agreement to share information with the US required them to classify their work, and now they also began pressing the US to agree to declassification.

By May 1958, basic information about the various projects within Project Sherwood including the stellarator, magnetic mirrors, and molecular ion beams had been released to the public.

== Development of other programs in controlled fusion ==
=== Oak Ridge National Laboratory ===
In the early 1950s, Oak Ridge National Laboratory was composed of a small group of scientists that were mostly experienced with research in ion-source technology. However, research from Project Sherwood was a growing area of interest, and the researchers at Oak Ridge National Laboratory wanted to participate in the discovery of controlled fusion. They studied areas of controlled fusion such as the rate of plasma diffusion in a magnetic field and the charge-exchange process. However, their work with ion-source was still a large part of their research.

=== University of California ===
Although there was already a main project (magnetic mirror) at the University of California, scientist W. R. Baker began research into the pinch effect at UCRL, Berkeley in 1952. Two years later, Stirling Colgate began research on shock-heating at UCRL, Livermore.

=== Tufts College, Medford ===
There was another small group of scientists at Tufts College in Medford, Massachusetts that had become involved in research of the pinch effect. Although their work was not officially part of the Atomic Energy Commission, some of their personnel attended the Sherwood conferences.

=== New York University ===
In 1954, there was a program started at New York University called the Division of Research. It was a small program that included personnel from the Institute of Mathematical Sciences at New York University.

=== Other programs (1955–1958) ===
- Massachusetts Institute of Technology (MIT)
- Carnegie Institute
- Westinghouse Electric Corporation
- Gould-National Batteries, Inc.
- General Electrical Company

== See also ==
- Timeline of nuclear fusion
- Stellarator
- Magnetic mirror
- Sherwood conferences
