= Harold Grad =

American mathematician (1923–1986)

- Dr. Harold Grad
- Born: January 23, 1923; New York City, New York
- Died: November 17, 1986 (aged 63)
- Education: Cooper Union (B.E.); New York University (MS, PhD)
- Known for: Biconic cusp Boltzmann–Grad limit Grad–Shafranov equation
- Awards: Guggenheim Fellow (1981); Eringen Medal (1982); James Clerk Maxwell Prize for Plasma Physics (1986)
- Scientific career
- Fields: Plasma physics, Statistical mechanics
- Doctoral advisor: Richard Courant

Harold Grad (January 23, 1923, in New York City – November 17, 1986) was an American applied mathematician. His work specialized in the application of statistical mechanics to plasma physics and magnetohydrodynamics.

== Work ==
In statistical mechanics he had developed in his thesis new methods for the solution of the Boltzmann equation. He derived the Boltzmann equation from Liouville equation using BBGKY hierarchy under certain limits, known as Boltzmann–Grad limit. Harold Grad was the founder of the Magneto-fluid Dynamics Division of the Courant Institute and served as its head until shortly before his death From 1964 to 1967 and 1974 to 1977 he was a member of the Advisory Committee for Fusion Energy at Oak Ridge National Laboratory.

Grad was a critic and supporter of many early fusion schemes including picket fences, magnetic mirrors and biconic cusps.

== Recognition ==
In 1970, Grad became a member of the National Academy of Sciences. He was an invited speaker at the International Congress of Mathematicians in Nice in 1970 and in Stockholm in 1962.

In 1981, Grad was awarded a Guggenheim Fellowship. In 1982, he was awarded the Eringen Medal from the Society of Engineering Science, and in 1986, he received the James Clerk Maxwell Prize for Plasma Physics from the American Physical Society.

The Courant Institute offers the Harold Grad Memorial Prize to outstanding performance and promise as a graduate student.

== Life ==
Grad received a bachelor's degree in electrical engineering from the Cooper Union in 1943 and his masters at New York University in 1945. Grad did his doctoral work under Richard Courant and graduated in 1948. His thesis was on the approximation of the Boltzmann Equation by torque. He was then at the Courant Institute of Mathematical Sciences of New York University from 1948 as associate professor and from 1957 until his death. Grad conducted research in magnetohydrodynamics, the mathematical formulation of plasma physics and applications of plasma physics to nuclear fusion. He led the magnetohydrodynamics department from 1956 until 1980.
