= Null (physics) =

In physics, a null is a point in a field where the field quantity is zero as the result of two or more opposing quantities completely cancelling each other. The field may be scalar, vector or tensor in nature. Common situations where nulls arise are in the polar patterns of microphones and antennae, and nulls caused by reflections of waves.

== Microphones ==
Cardioid microphone polar pattern

Shotgun microphone polar pattern

A common polar pattern for microphones is the cardioid. This has a single direction in which the microphone does not respond to impinging sound waves. Highly directional (shotgun) microphones have more complex polar patterns. These microphones have a large, narrow lobe in the main direction of sound reception but also a smaller lobe in the opposite direction and usually also several other smaller lobes. This pattern is achieved by wave cancellation inside the body of the microphone. Between each of these lobes is a null direction where no sound at all is detected.

== Antennae ==
Dipole antenna polar pattern

A common, and basic, radio antenna is the dipole. This has a figure-of-eight polar pattern with two nulls on opposite sides. Highly directional antennae, such as the Yagi have polar patterns very similar to highly directional microphones and for similar reasons. That is, they have multiple small lobes off the main direction with nulls between them.

== Standing waves ==
Pressure standing waves in a closed tube: modes 1, 2 and 3

Nulls in a standing wave pattern on a transmission line

Standing waves can be caused by a wave being reflected back through the transmission medium in which it arrived. If the incident and reflected waves are transmitted without loss then there will be points along the transmission path where the incident and reflected waves exactly cancel each other due to them being in antiphase.

Standing waves are found in wind musical instruments. Wind instruments consist of a tube which acts as an acoustic transmission line in which standing waves are set up. Open ended tubes must have zero air pressure change at the end of the tube so this point is a pressure null. Closed tubes must have zero air velocity at the end of the tube so this point is a velocity null. There may be further nulls along the tube depending on the vibration mode that has been set up by the instrument player. Higher modes have more nulls.

Standing waves also occur on electrical transmission lines. A line with a non-resistive termination will cause a reflection of the signal from the termination with the same amplitude as the incident wave. These waves will cancel periodically along the line causing nulls every half wavelength. The distance of the first null from the termination depends on the nature of the terminating impedance. Nulls on transmission lines are very sharp, in contrast to the peaks which are broad and flat. This makes the nulls easier to measure. An instrument in electronics for measuring the positions of nulls on a line is the slotted line. This instrument can also be used to measure VSWR. With the measurement of VSWR and the null positions the value of the terminating impedance's magnitude and phase can be calculated.

== Measuring bridges ==
Nulls are used in electrical science to make many measurements. A frequently encountered technique is to adjust the voltage in one branch of a circuit until it nulls out a voltage in another branch. Commonly, a bridge circuit is used for this purpose. There are many varieties of measurement bridge, the most well known of these being the Wheatstone bridge used to accurately measure the resistance of an unknown component against a calibrated variable resistance by comparing the voltages across each. The central branch of the bridge has the voltage under test on one side and the calibrated voltage on the other: when they are equal the voltage across the central branch is nulled out. The measurement is carried out by placing an instrument to detect voltage or current in the central branch. An advantage of the bridge method is that this instrument does not need to be calibrated since it is only required detect nulls, not to actually measure a voltage. The accuracy of the measurement will, however, depend on the sensitivity of the instrument since this will affect the resolution of the bridge.
