= Diffusion Inhibitor =

Experimental fusion power device

- Device type: toroidal
- Location: United States
- Affiliation: NACA

History
- Year(s) of operation: 1938–1938

The Diffusion Inhibitor is the first known attempt to build a working fusion power device. It was designed and built at the National Advisory Committee for Aeronautics' (NACA) Langley Memorial Aeronautical Laboratory beginning in the spring of 1938. The basic concept was developed by Arthur Kantrowitz and his boss, Eastman Jacobs. They deliberately picked a misleading name to avoid the project being detected by NACA's headquarters in Washington, D.C., as they believed it would immediately be cancelled if their superiors learned of it.

In overall terms, the device was very similar to the toroidal magnetic confinement fusion reactor designs that emerged in the 1950s and 60s, with a strong physical resemblance to the z-pinch and tokamak devices. The major difference was that it used radio waves to heat the plasma while using the magnetic field for confinement alone, not compression. After several early experiments which showed no sign of high-energy releases, NACA director George William Lewis happened into the lab and immediately shut it down.

An almost identical concept was promoted in the UK in 1946, the toroidal solenoid, but they were unaware of the US work which had not been published.

== History ==
In 1936, Arthur Kantrowitz, a recent physics graduate from Columbia University, joined NACA's Langley Memorial Aeronautical Laboratory. In early 1938 he read an article that noted Westinghouse had recently purchased a Van de Graaff generator and concluded the company was beginning research into nuclear power, following the footsteps of Mark Oliphant who demonstrated fusion of hydrogen isotopes in 1932 using a particle accelerator. His direct supervisor, Eastman Jacobs, also expressed an interest in the concept when Kantrowitz showed him the article.

Kantrowitz began canvassing the literature and came across Hans Bethe's paper in Reviews of Modern Physics about the known types of nuclear reactions and Bethe's speculations on the ones taking place in stars, work that would lead to the Nobel Prize in Physics. This led Kantrowitz to consider the concept of heating hydrogen to the temperatures seen inside stars, with the expectation that one could build a fusion reactor. The easiest reaction in the list was deuterium-deuterium, but having only been discovered in 1932, the supply of deuterium was extremely limited. A pure hydrogen-hydrogen reaction was selected instead, although this would require much higher temperatures to work.

Kantrowitz's idea was to use radio frequency signals to heat a plasma, in the same way that a microwave oven uses radio signals to heat food. The system did not have to use microwave frequencies, however, as the charged particles in a plasma will efficiently absorb a wide range of frequencies. This allowed Kantrowitz to use a conventional radio transmitter as the source, building a 150 W oscillator for the purpose.

In order to produce any detectable level of fusion reactions, the system would have to heat the plasma to about 10 million degrees Celsius, a temperature that would melt any physical container. At these temperatures, even the atoms of the fuel itself break up into a fluid of separate nuclei and electrons, a state known as a plasma. Kantrowitz concluded the simplest solution was to use magnetic fields to confine the plasma because plasmas are electrically charged so their movement can be controlled by magnetic fields.

When placed within a magnetic field, the electrons and protons of a hydrogen plasma will orbit around the magnetic lines of force. This means that if the plasma were within a solenoid, the field would keep the particles confined away from the walls but they would be free to travel along the lines and out the ends of the solenoid. At fusion temperatures, the particles are moving at the equivalent of thousands of miles per hour, so this would happen almost instantly. Kantrowitz came to the conclusion that many others did: The simple solution is to bend the solenoid around into a circle so the particles would flow around the resulting ring-shaped toroidal enclosure.

Jacobs approached the lab's director, George W. Lewis, to arrange a small amount of funding, explaining that such a system might one day be used for aircraft propulsion. To disguise the actual purpose from NACA leadership, they called it the "Diffusion Inhibitor". Lewis agreed to provide $5,000 (equivalent to $111,690 in 2024). The torus was wound with copper magnet cables which were cooled by water, and for a power source, they connected it to the motor circuits of a wind tunnel Jacobs had built. The idea was to measure the resulting fusion reactions by their X-rays, which are emitted from very hot objects.

Because the city's power supply was limited, the wind tunnel was only allowed to operate late at night or early morning and for no more than half an hour at maximum power. Using film developed for taking dental x-rays as their detector, the two fired up the machine but found no signal. Believing the problem was that the radio oscillator didn't have enough power, they tried again while manually holding in the circuit breakers to supply more current. Again, nothing appeared on the film. They concluded that something was causing the plasma to be lost from the center of the reactor, but did not have an obvious solution.

No further experiments were carried out. Shortly after the first runs, Lewis visited the lab, listened to Jacobs's explanation of the system, and immediately shut it down.

It would later be understood that the simple torus design does not correctly confine a plasma. When a solenoid is bent around into a circle, the magnets ringing the container end up being spread apart from each other on the outside circumference. That results in the field being weaker on the outside of the container than the inside. This asymmetry causes the plasma to drift away from the center, eventually hitting the walls.
