= John Cockcroft =

British physicist (1897–1967)

Sir John Cockcroft OM KCB CBE FRS
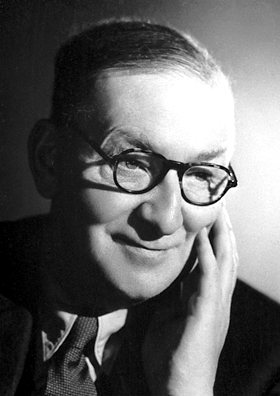
- Cockcroft in 1951

1st Master of Churchill College, Cambridge
- In office 1959–1967
- Preceded by: Office established
- Succeeded by: Sir William Hawthorne

Personal details
- Born: John Douglas Cockcroft; 27 May 1897 Todmorden, England
- Died: 18 September 1967 (aged 70) Cambridge, England
- Resting place: Ascension Parish Burial Ground, Cambridge
- Spouse: Eunice Elizabeth Crabtree (m. 1925)
- Children: 6
- Education: Victoria University of Manchester; Manchester Municipal College of Technology (BSc); University of Cambridge (BA, PhD)
- Known for: First fully artificial nuclear transmutation
- Awards: Hughes Medal (1938); James Alfred Ewing Medal (1947); Nobel Prize in Physics (1951); Royal Medal (1954); Faraday Medal (1955); Niels Bohr International Gold Medal (1958); Wilhelm Exner Medal (1961); Atoms for Peace Award (1961)
- Scientific career
- Fields: Physics
- Workplaces: University of Cambridge; Atomic Energy Research Establishment
- Thesis: On phenomena occurring in the condensation of molecular streams on surfaces (1928)
- Doctoral advisor: Ernest Rutherford
- Notable students: R. S. Krishnan

Sir John Douglas Cockcroft (27 May 1897 – 18 September 1967) was a British experimental physicist who shared the 1951 Nobel Prize in Physics with Ernest Walton for their splitting of the atomic nucleus, which led to the development of nuclear power and weapons.

After service on the Western Front with the Royal Field Artillery during the Great War, Cockcroft studied electrical engineering at Manchester Municipal College of Technology whilst he was an apprentice at Metropolitan Vickers Trafford Park and was also a member of their research staff. He then won a scholarship to St John's College, Cambridge, where he sat the Tripos exam in June 1924, becoming a Wrangler. Ernest Rutherford accepted Cockcroft as a research student in the Cavendish Laboratory, and Cockcroft completed his doctorate under Rutherford's supervision in 1928. With Walton and Mark Oliphant, he built what became known as a Cockcroft–Walton generator. Cockcroft and Walton used this to perform the first artificial disintegration of an atomic nucleus, a feat popularly known as "splitting the atom."

During the Second World War, Cockcroft became assistant director of scientific research in the Ministry of Supply, working on radar. He was also a member of the committee formed to handle issues arising from the Frisch–Peierls memorandum, which calculated that an atomic bomb could be technically feasible, and of the MAUD Committee which succeeded it. In 1940, as part of the Tizard Mission, he shared British technology with his counterparts in the United States. Later in the war, the fruits of the Tizard Mission came back to Britain in the form of the SCR-584 radar set and the proximity fuze, which were used to help defeat the V-1 flying bomb. In May 1944, he became director of the Montreal Laboratory, and oversaw the development of the ZEEP and NRX reactors, and the creation of the Chalk River Laboratories.

After the war Cockcroft became the director of the Atomic Energy Research Establishment (AERE) at Harwell, where the low-powered, graphite-moderated GLEEP became the first nuclear reactor to operate in western Europe when it was started on 15 August 1947. This was followed by the British Experimental Pile 0 (BEPO) in 1948. Harwell was involved in the design of the reactors and the chemical separation plant at Windscale. Under his direction it took part in frontier fusion research, including the ZETA program. His insistence that the chimney stacks of the Windscale reactors be fitted with filters was mocked as Cockcroft's Folly until the core of one of the reactors ignited and released radionuclides during the Windscale fire of 1957.

From 1959 to 1967, he was the first master of Churchill College, Cambridge. He was also the chancellor of the Australian National University in Canberra from 1961 to 1965.

== Early life and education ==
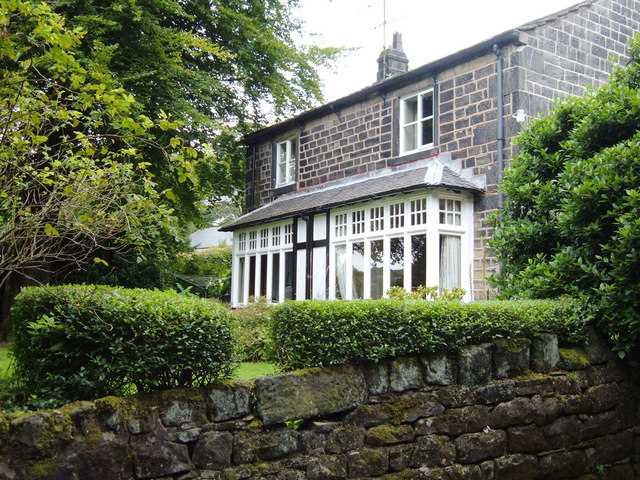
The house in Walsden, Todmorden, where Cockcroft lived from the age of two until he was 28-years-old.

John Douglas Cockcroft was born on 27 May 1897 in Todmorden, England, the eldest son of Annie Maude (née Fielden) and John Arthur Cockcroft, a mill owner. He had four younger brothers; Eric, Philip, Keith and Lionel. His early education was at the Church of England school in Walsden from 1901 to 1908, at Todmorden Elementary School from 1908 to 1909, and at Todmorden Secondary School from 1909 to 1914, where he played football and cricket. Among the girls at the school was his future wife, Eunice Elizabeth Crabtree. In 1914, he won a County Major Scholarship, West Riding of Yorkshire, to the Victoria University of Manchester, where he studied mathematics.

The Great War broke out in August 1914. Cockcroft completed his first year at Manchester in June 1915. He joined the Officers' Training Corps there, but did not wish to become an officer. During the summer break he worked at a YMCA canteen at Kinmel Camp in Wales. He enlisted in the British Army on 24 November 1915. On 29 March 1916, he joined the 59th Training Brigade, Royal Field Artillery, where he was trained as a signaller. He was then posted to B Battery, 92nd Field Artillery Brigade, one of the units of the 20th (Light) Division, on the Western Front.

Cockcroft participated in the Advance to the Hindenburg Line and the Third Battle of Ypres. He applied for a commission, and was accepted. He was sent to Brighton in February 1918 to learn about gunnery, and in April 1918, to the Officer Candidate School in Weedon Bec in Northamptonshire, where he was trained as a field artillery officer. He was commissioned as a lieutenant in the Royal Field Artillery on 17 October 1918.

After the war ended, Cockcroft was released from the Army in January 1919. He elected not to return to the Victoria University of Manchester, but to study electrical engineering under Miles Walker at the Manchester Municipal College of Technology (now the University of Manchester Institute of Science and Technology). Because Cockcroft had completed a year at the Victoria University of Manchester, he was allowed to skip the first year of the course, graduating in 1922 with a Bachelor of Science in Technology. After graduation, Walker persuaded him to take up a two-year apprenticeship with Metropolitan Vickers.

Walker then suggested Cockcroft sit for a scholarship to St John's College, Cambridge, Walker's alma mater. Cockcroft was successful, winning a £30 scholarship and a £20 bursary awarded to undergraduates of limited means. Metropolitan Vickers gave him £50 subject to his returning after completing his degree. Walker and an aunt made up the balance of the £316 fee. As a graduate of another university, he was allowed to skip the first year of the Tripos. He sat the Mathematical Tripos exam in June 1924, achieved a B* as a Wrangler, and was awarded a Bachelor of Arts.

Cockcroft married Elizabeth Crabtree on 26 August 1925, in a ceremony at the Bridge Street United Methodist Church in Todmorden. They had six children. The first, a boy known as Timothy, died in infancy. They subsequently had four daughters, Joan Dorothea (Thea), Jocelyn, Elisabeth Fielden and Catherine Helena; and another son, Christopher Hugh John.

== Research ==
Ernest Rutherford accepted Cockcroft as a research student in the Cavendish Laboratory on the recommendation of Miles Walker and the director of research at Metropolitan Vickers. Cockcroft enrolled as a PhD student in 1924, with a Foundation Scholarship of St John's College, and a State Scholarship. Under Rutherford's supervision, he wrote his doctoral thesis, On phenomena occurring in the condensation of molecular streams on surfaces, which was published in the Proceedings of the Royal Society. He was awarded his doctorate on 6 September 1928. During this time he was an assistant to the Russian physicist Peter Kapitza, who was working on the physics of magnetic fields in extremely low temperatures. Cockcroft helped with the design and construction of helium liquefiers.

In 1919, Rutherford had succeeded in disintegrating nitrogen atoms with alpha particles emitted from decaying radium atoms. This and subsequent experiments hinted at the structure of atomic nuclei. To explore it further, he needed an artificial means of creating particles with a velocity high enough to overcome the charge of the nucleus. This opened a new line of research at the Cavendish Laboratory. He assigned Cockcroft, Thomas Allibone and Ernest Walton to the problem. They built what became known as a Cockcroft–Walton accelerator. Mark Oliphant designed a proton source for them. A crucial moment came when Cockcroft read a paper by George Gamow on quantum tunnelling. Cockcroft realised that as a result of this phenomenon, the desired effect could be achieved with much lower voltages than first thought. In fact, he calculated that protons with energy of just 300,000 electronvolts would be able to penetrate a boron nucleus. Cockcroft and Walton worked on their accelerator for the next two years. Rutherford obtained a £1,000 grant from the University of Cambridge for them to buy a transformer and other equipment they needed.

Cockcroft was elected a Fellow of St John's College on 5 November 1928. He and Walton began operating their accelerator in March 1932, bombarding lithium and beryllium with high-energy protons. They expected to see gamma rays, which French scientists had reported, but none were found. In February 1932, James Chadwick demonstrated that what had been observed were actually neutrons. Cockcroft and Walton then switched to looking for alpha particles instead. On 14 April 1932, Walton bombarded a lithium target and noticed what he thought might be alpha particles. Cockcroft and then Rutherford were summoned, and confirmed that this was indeed the case. That evening, Cockcroft and Walton met at Rutherford's home and produced a letter for Nature in which they announced their results, the first artificial disintegration of an atomic nucleus, which can be described thus:

^{7}_{3}Li + p → 2^{4}_{2}He + 17.2 MeV

This feat was popularly known as "splitting the atom." For this accomplishment, Cockcroft and Walton were jointly awarded the Hughes Medal in 1938, and the Nobel Prize in Physics in 1951. They went on to disintegrate carbon, nitrogen and oxygen using protons, deuterons and alpha particles. They demonstrated that they had produced radioactive isotopes, including carbon-11 and nitrogen-13.

Cockcroft–Walton voltage multiplier circuit

In 1929, Cockcroft was appointed a Supervisor in Mechanical Sciences at St John's College. He was appointed a Supervisor in Physics in 1931, and in 1933 became the junior bursar, making him responsible for the upkeep of the buildings, many of which were suffering from neglect. The college gatehouse had to be partly taken down in order to repair damage done by deathwatch beetles, and Cockcroft supervised rewiring of the electrics. In 1935, Rutherford appointed him the director of research at the Mond Laboratory after Kapitza, who had returned to the Soviet Union. He supervised the installation of new cryogenic equipment, and supervised low temperature research. He was elected a Fellow of the Royal Society in 1936, and in 1939 was appointed Jacksonian Professor of Natural Philosophy.

Cockcroft and Walton were well aware of the limits of their accelerator. A much better design had been developed in the United States by Ernest Lawrence, which he called the cyclotron. The Cavendish Laboratory was able to keep ahead of the Americans despite having an inferior accelerator with clever physics, but Cockcroft pressed Rutherford to obtain a cyclotron for the Cavendish Laboratory. Rutherford baulked at the price tag, but a £250,000 gift from Lord Austin enabled a 36-inch (910 mm) cyclotron, based on Lawrence's design, to be built, along with a new wing to house it. Cockcroft supervised the work. The cyclotron was in operation by October 1938, and the new wing was completed in 1940. Oliphant felt that the cyclotron was not big enough, and commenced construction of a larger 60-inch cyclotron at the University of Birmingham. Its construction was delayed by the outbreak of the Second World War in Europe in 1939, and it too would be obsolescent when it was completed after the war.

== World War II ==
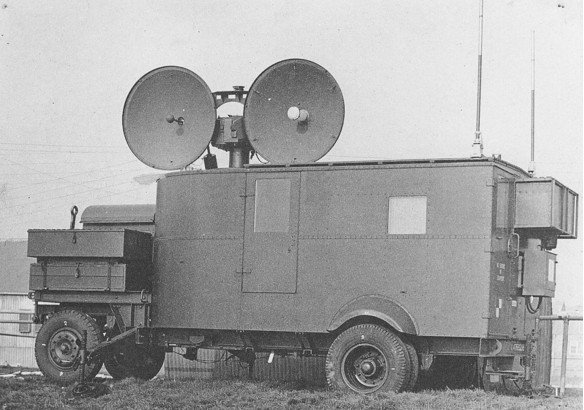
GL Mk. III radar

On the outbreak of World War II, Cockcroft took up the post of assistant director of scientific research in the Ministry of Supply, working on radar. In 1938, Sir Henry Tizard showed Cockcroft Chain Home, the ring of coastal early-warning radar stations built by the Royal Air Force (RAF) to detect and track aircraft. Now, he helped deploy scientists to help get the system fully operational. In 1940, he became part of the Advisory Council for Scientific Research and Technical Development. In April 1940, along he became a member of the Committee for the Scientific Study of Air Warfare formed to handle issues arising from the Frisch–Peierls memorandum, which calculated that an atomic bomb could be technically feasible. This committee was succeeded by the MAUD Committee, of which Cockcroft was also a member, in June 1940. This committee directed the ground-breaking early research in Britain.

In August 1940, Cockcroft travelled to the United States as part of the Tizard Mission. Because Britain had developed many new technologies but lacked the industrial capacity to fully exploit them, it was decided to share them with the United States, although that nation was not yet at war. The information provided by the Tizard Mission contained some of the greatest scientific advances made during the war. The shared technology included radar technologies, in particular the greatly improved cavity magnetron designed by Oliphant's group at Birmingham, which the American historian James Phinney Baxter III described as "the most valuable cargo ever brought to our shores," the design for the proximity fuze, details of Frank Whittle's jet engine and the Frisch–Peierls memorandum describing the feasibility of an atomic bomb. Though these may be considered the most significant, many other items were also transported, including designs for rockets, superchargers, gunsights and submarine detection devices. He returned to Britain in December 1940.

Soon after his return, Cockcroft was appointed Chief Superintendent of the Air Defence Research Development Establishment (ADRDE) at Christchurch, Hampshire. His focus was on the use of radar for shooting down enemy aircraft. The GL Mk. III radar was developed as a target tracking and predicting radar, but by 1942 the SCR-584 radar developed for the same purpose in the United States became available, and Cockcroft recommended that it be acquired under Lend-Lease. On his own initiative, he acquired SCR-584 sets for testing, and trials conducted on the Isle of Sheppey in October 1943 conclusively demonstrated that SCR-584 was superior. This made Cockcroft very unpopular at the Ministry of Supply, but he had intelligence that the Germans were planning to deploy the V-1 flying bomb. On 1 January 1944, Lieutenant-general Sir Ronald Weeks sent Washington an urgent request for 134 SCR-584 sets.

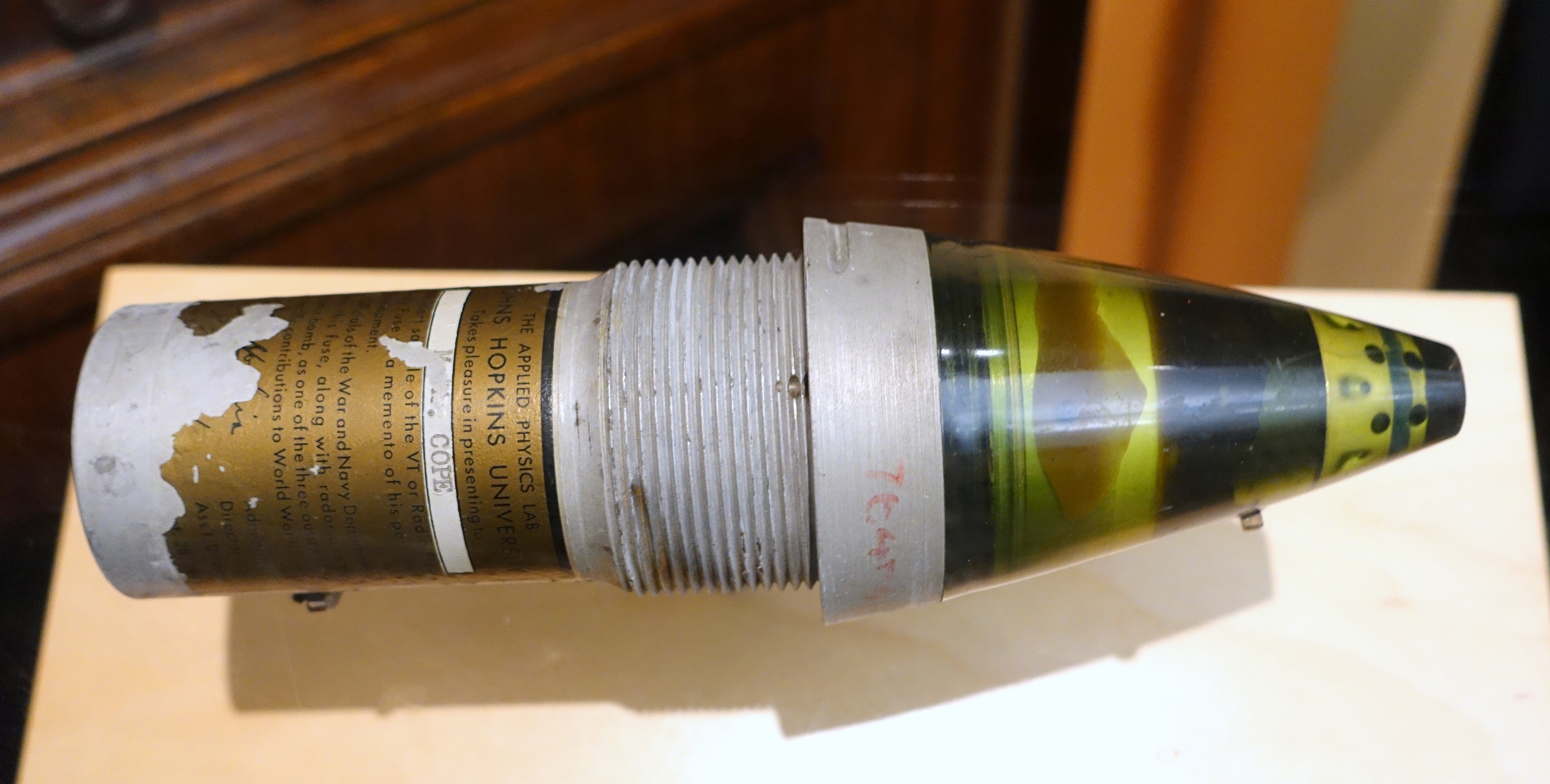
A proximity fuze

The proximity fuze had been pioneered by Alan Butement. The idea was that if a shell could explode when it was near an enemy aircraft, a near miss would be nearly as effective as a direct hit. The technical problem was to miniaturise a radar set, and make it sturdy enough to be fired from a gun barrel. The second problem had been solved by the Germans; a dud German bomb was salvaged that had valves that could withstand the acceleration. Plans were given to the Americans by the Tizard Mission, but work continued in Britain, where a team was established at Christchurch under Charles Drummond Ellis in February 1942. Work proceeded fitfully, and by 1943, production was still two years away. On a visit to the United States in November 1943, Cockcroft discussed adapting the American proximity fuze for British use with Merle Tuve. As a result, 150,000 fuzes for QF 3.7-inch AA guns were ordered on 16 January 1944. The fuzes arrived in time to engage the V-1 flying bombs in August 1944, shooting down 97 percent of them. For his services, he was made a Commander of the Order of the British Empire in June 1944.

In August 1943, the Quebec Agreement subsumed the British Tube Alloys project into the Manhattan Project, and established the Combined Policy Committee to control the Manhattan Project. A final agreement was spelt out on 20 May 1944. Under it, the Americans would assist with the construction of a heavy water-moderated nuclear reactor in Canada, and would provide technical assistance with matters such as corrosion and the effects of radiation on materials. They would not provide details about plutonium chemistry or metallurgy, although irradiated uranium slugs were made available for the British to work it out for themselves. A sticking point was the director of the Montreal Laboratory, Hans von Halban, who was a poor administrator, did not work well with the Canadians, and was regarded as a security risk by the Americans. In April 1944 a Combined Policy Committee meeting at Washington agreed that Montreal Laboratory scientists who were not British subjects would leave, and Cockcroft would become the new director of the Montreal Laboratory in May 1944.

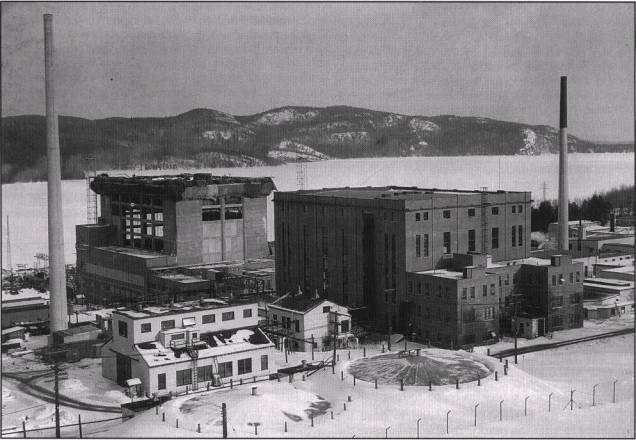
ZEEP reactor in February 1954 with NRX and NRU (under construction, in background).

On 24 August 1944, the decision was taken to build a small reactor in order to test the Montreal Laboratory's calculations relating to such matters as lattice dimensions, sheathing materials, and control rods, before proceeding with the full-scale NRX reactor. This was named ZEEP, for Zero Energy Experimental Pile. Building reactors in downtown Montreal was out of the question; the Canadians selected, and Groves approved, a site at Chalk River, Ontario, on the south bank of the Ottawa River some 110 miles (180 km) north west of Ottawa. The Chalk River Laboratories opened in 1944, and the Montreal Laboratory was closed in July 1946. ZEEP went critical on 5 September 1945, becoming the first operating nuclear reactor outside the United States. The larger NRX followed on 21 July 1947. With five times the neutron flux of any other reactor, it was the most powerful research reactor in the world. Originally designed in July 1944 with an output of 8 MW, the power was raised to 10 MW through design changes such as replacing uranium rods clad in stainless steel and cooled by heavy water with aluminium-clad rods cooled by light water.

Cockcroft was shocked when he was informed on 10 September 1945 that the British physicist Alan Nunn May, who worked at the Chalk River Laboratories, was a Soviet spy. In August 1947, Cockcroft was one of the scientists who signed a petition urging that Nunn May's ten-year prison sentence be reduced, an act he later regretted.

== Post-war ==
In April 1945, Cockcroft and Oliphant scouted a site for a similar establishment in Britain, settling on RAF Harwell. Cockcroft was offered the directorship of the Atomic Energy Research Establishment (AERE) at Harwell on 9 November 1945. The official announcement was made on 29 January 1946, but the news leaked two months before the announcement, and before the Canadian government was informed, creating a diplomatic incident. It was agreed that Cockcroft would not depart until a successor was found, and he did not depart Chalk River for Harwell until 30 September 1946. In the meantime he recruited staff for the new laboratory. Klaus Fuchs from the Manhattan Project's Los Alamos Laboratory became head of the Theoretical Physics; Robert Spence, Cockcroft's deputy at Montreal Laboratory, became head of Chemistry; H.W.B. Skinner, of General Physics; Otto Frisch, of Nuclear Physics; and John Dunworth, of Reactor Physics. Fuchs was later arrested as a Soviet spy on 3 February 1950.

The low-powered, graphite-moderated GLEEP, which stood for Graphite Low Energy Experimental Pile, was designed by the Montreal Laboratory, and became the first nuclear reactor to operate in Western Europe when it was started on 15 August 1947. This was followed by BEPO, a 6 MW research reactor designed by AERE, on 3 July 1948. Because heavy water was unavailable in Britain, BEPO was designed and built as a graphite-moderated reactor. Harwell was involved in the design of reactors at Windscale, and the chemical separation plant there. The passage of the Atomic Energy Act of 1946 (McMahon Act) in August 1946, made it clear that the UK would no longer be allowed access to the United States' atomic research. This partly resulted from the arrest for espionage of Alan Nunn May in February 1946. Cockcroft helped negotiate a new, more informal and unsigned agreement with the Americans that was announced on 7 January 1948, known as the Modus Vivendi. The renewed cooperation that he hoped for under the agreement proved illusory. The development of the independent British nuclear deterrent led to the Atomic Energy Act being amended in 1958, and to a resumption of the nuclear Special Relationship between America and Britain under the 1958 US–UK Mutual Defence Agreement.

Under Cockcroft's direction, AERE took part in frontier fusion research in the post-war years, including the ZETA program. Sir George Paget Thomson began research in nuclear fusion at Imperial College London in 1946. This was subsequently transferred to the Associated Electrical Industries Laboratory at Aldermaston, under Allibone's direction. Research independently began at Oxford University under Peter Thonemann. In 1951, Cockcroft arranged for the Oxford group to be transferred to Harwell. Cockcroft approved the construction of ZETA (Zero Energy Thermonuclear Assembly) by the Thonemann's Harwell group, and the smaller Sceptre by Allibone's AEI group. James L. Tuck's group at the Los Alamos Laboratory was also researching fusion, and Cockcroft struck an agreement with the Americans that they would release their results together, which was done in 1958. Despite Cockcroft's perennial optimism that a breakthrough was imminent, fusion power remained an elusive goal.

=== Cockcroft's Folly ===
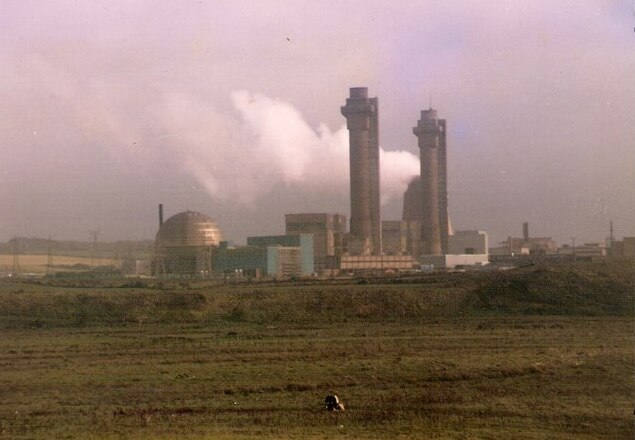
The two chimney stacks of the Windscale reactors, with the visible swellings to house Cockcroft's filters.

As director of the AERE, Cockcroft famously insisted that the chimney stacks of the Windscale plutonium production reactors be fitted, at great expense, with high-performance filters. That was in response to a report that uranium oxide had been found in the vicinity of the X-10 Graphite Reactor in Oak Ridge, Tennessee. Because it was decided to fit them after the stacks had been designed, the filters became pronounced lumps at the top of the chimneys.

The reactors had been designed to remain clean and uncorroded during use, so it was thought there would be no particulate for the filters to catch. As well, the uranium oxide at Oak Ridge turned out to be from the chemical plant and not the reactor. The filters therefore became known as "Cockcroft's Folly". However, when the core of one of the two reactors ignited the Windscale fire of 1957, the filters prevented a far worse release of radioactive material. Terence Price, future scientific advisor at the Ministry of Defence in the 1960s, noted that "the word folly did not seem appropriate after the accident".

== Later life ==
On 24 January 1959, Churchill College, Cambridge, was formally recognised by the university. Two days later, the trustees announced that Cockcroft would be its first master. Although it would also teach the humanities and social sciences, 70 percent of the student body would study science and technology-related subjects. He nominated the first fellows, and he oversaw the initial construction. Controversy arose over the chapel. A 1961 plan to build it at the entrance to the college, as was traditional at Cambridge, led to the immediate resignation of Francis Crick, a staunch atheist, as a fellow. The first undergraduates arrived in 1961, and the college, still incomplete, was formally opened by Prince Philip, Duke of Edinburgh, on 5 June 1964.

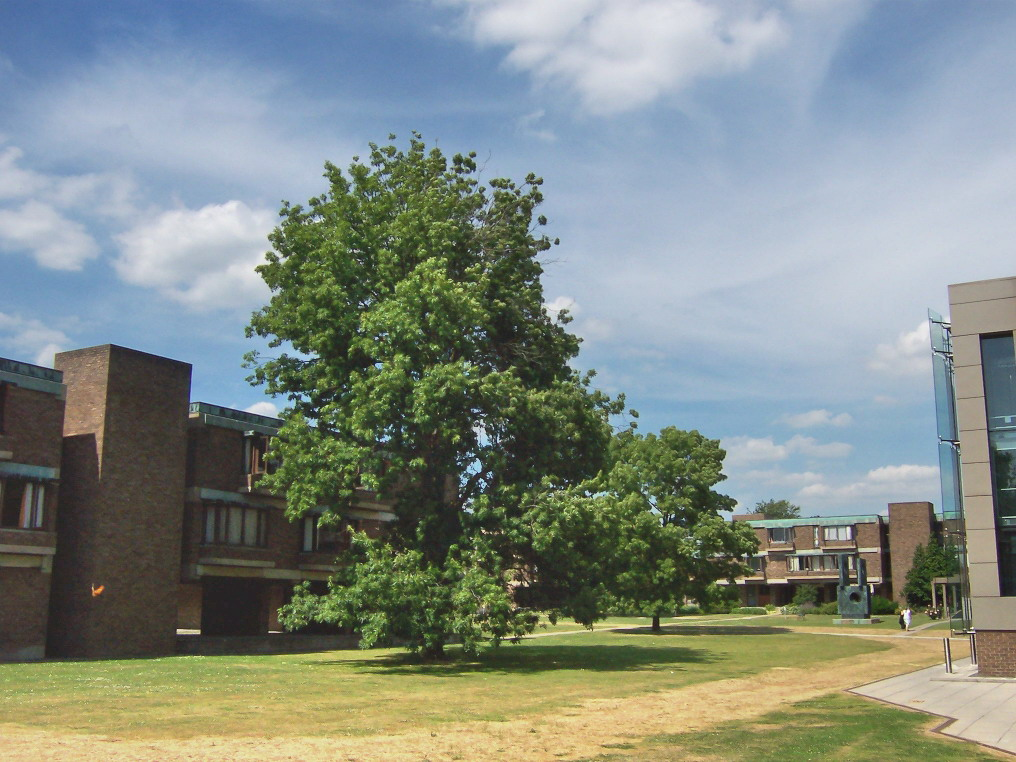
Churchill College, Cambridge, in 2005

Cockcroft was president of the Institute of Physics from 1954 to 1956, and of the British Association for the Advancement of Science. He served as chancellor of the Australian National University in Canberra from 1961 to 1965, a largely symbolic post that involved a visit once a year for degree conferring ceremonies. He delivered the Rutherford Memorial Lecture in 1944. He was the British delegate on the Council of CERN as well as Chairman of the Nuclear Physics Sub-Committee of the Department of Scientific and Industrial Research.

Cockcroft died of a heart attack at his home at Churchill College, Cambridge, on 18 September 1967 at the age of 70. He is buried at the Parish of the Ascension Burial Ground in Cambridge, in the same grave as his son Timothy. A memorial service was held at Westminster Abbey on 17 October 1967.

== Recognition ==
=== Memberships ===
Year	Organisation	Type	Ref.
1936	Royal Society	Fellow	

=== Awards ===
Year	Organisation	Award	Citation	Ref.
1938	Royal Society	Hughes Medal	"For their [Cockcroft and Ernest Walton] discovery that nuclei could be disintegrated by artificially produced bombarding particles."	
1947	Institution of Civil Engineers	James Alfred Ewing Medal	—	
1951	Royal Swedish Academy of Sciences	Nobel Prize in Physics	"For their [Cockcroft and Ernest Walton] pioneer work on the transmutation of atomic nuclei by artificially accelerated atomic particles."	
1954	Royal Society	Royal Medal	"In recognition of his distinguished work on nuclear and atomic physics."	
1955	Institution of Electrical Engineers	Faraday Medal	—	
1958	Danish Society of Engineers	Niels Bohr International Gold Medal	—	
1961	Österreichischer Gewerbeverein	Wilhelm Exner Medal	—	
1961	—	Atoms for Peace Award	—	

=== Honours ===
Year	Country	Honour	Ref.
1944	United Kingdom	Commander of the Order of the British Empire	
1948	United Kingdom	Knight Bachelor	
1952	France	Knight of the Legion of Honour	
1953	United Kingdom	Knight Commander of the Order of the Bath	
1957	United Kingdom	Order of Merit	

== Commemoration ==
Several buildings in the United Kingdom are named after him: the Cockcroft building at the New Museums Site of the University of Cambridge, comprising a lecture theatre and several hardware laboratories; the Cockcroft Institute at Daresbury Laboratory in Cheshire; the Cockcroft building of the University of Brighton; and the Cockcroft building of the University of Salford. The oldest building at the Research School of Physical Sciences and Engineering, Australian National University, the Cockcroft building, is named after him. Cockcroft Crater on the far side of the Moon was named after him in 1970.

Cockcroft's papers are held at the Churchill Archives Centre in Cambridge, and are accessible to the public. They include his lab books, correspondence, photographs (with dozens depicting the construction of Chalk River, CKFT 26/4), theses and political papers.

Academic offices
Preceded by Edward Victor Appleton	Jacksonian Professor of Natural Philosophy; 1939–1946	Succeeded by Otto Robert Frisch
New institution	Master of Churchill College, Cambridge; 1959–1967	Succeeded by William Hawthorne
Preceded by Stanley Bruce	Chancellor of the Australian National University; 1961–1965	Succeeded by Howard Florey
