= Peter Thonemann =

Australian-born British physicist

Peter Clive Thonemann
- Born: 3 June 1917; Melbourne, Australia
- Died: 10 February 2018 (aged 100); Swansea, Wales
- Scientific career
- Fields: Physics, biology

Peter Clive Thonemann (3 June 1917 – 10 February 2018) was an Australian-born British physicist who was a pioneer in the field of fusion power while working in the United Kingdom.

Thonemann was born in Melbourne and moved to Oxford University in 1944, becoming one of the earliest researchers on the topic of controlled fusion. He led the fusion research at Oxford in its early years, before moving to the Atomic Energy Research Establishment (Harwell) in 1950. He led the ZETA reactor development at Harwell and announced its apparent success in 1958.

Thonemann was deputy director of the new Culham Laboratory in 1965–66. In 1968 he left Culham to become Professor of Physics at today's Swansea University, where he worked on applying his physics knowledge to biological research. He retired from Swansea in 1984, living out his life in the city.

== Early life and education ==
Julius Emil Thonemann moved to Australia from Germany in 1854 and was consul to Victoria for the Austro-Hungarian Empire from 1866 to 1879. His son, Frederick Emil Thonemann, was born in 1860 in Melbourne. Frederick established a wool trading business, Thonemann and Lange, which later became a stock brokerage, F. Thonemann and Sons, among other businesses. Peter was the second of four children, born to Frederick's second wife, Mabel Jessie Fyfe.

Peter grew up in the family's large house, "Rathgawn", (Note: The Times says it was named "Merriyala", but that might be a second property.) and attended Melbourne Grammar School. In 1936 he began a physics degree at the University of Melbourne, completing his bachelor's degree in 1939. When the war started that year, he was sent to work at the Munitions Supply Laboratories in Melbourne, where he worked until 1942 when he moved to Amalgamated Wireless in Sydney. There, he met his future wife, Jean, with whom he had two children, Helena, in 1946, and Philip, in 1949.

In 1944 he began his master's degree at the University of Sydney, where he wrote his thesis on the study of high frequency fields in an ionized gas. Australian universities were not offering PhDs at that time, so he took a position at Oxford University later that year.

== Fusion work ==
Immediately after the war, Jim Tuck returned to Oxford from his time on the Manhattan Project. He met Thonemann, whose experience in electric discharges in gas made him familiar with the pinch effect, a possible route to controlled fusion. The two wrote a proposal to build a small machine, but before it was approved, Tuck returned to the US.

In 1947, Cousins and Ware began experiments using pinch in toroidal tubes. Thonemann was able to arrange a small amount of funding, and in 1948 began basic experiments with electrical discharges in a linear tube containing mercury gas to study the pinch effect. By the next year he had moved to a larger copper torus and was able to demonstrate the pinch to Frederick Lindemann and John Cockcroft. Thonemann became the Atomic Energy Research Establishment (AERE) Head of Research on Controlled Thermonuclear Reactions in 1949, a position he held until 1960.

As a result of the exposing of Klaus Fuchs as a Soviet spy, by 1952 the fusion research at Oxford was moved to Harwell, while Cousins and Ware's work moved to the Atomic Weapons Establishment at Aldermaston. At Harwell, Cockcroft had successfully argued for the construction of a much larger machine, ZETA.

By 1957, early indications were that ZETA had successfully produced tiny amounts of fusion, and the story began to leak to the press. This led to considerable coverage about Thonemann's role in the Australian press. In January it was announced that ZETA had succeeded. After further work, it became clear that the signals of fusion were false, and the story had to be withdrawn, causing great embarrassment.

After some arguments within the UK scientific establishment, the decision was made to move the fusion-related work to a new location at Culham. Thonemann moved to Culham and became the deputy director during 1965–66.

== Biological studies ==
In 1968, Thonemann moved to University College of Swansea, now Swansea University, to become a professor of physics. He was not able to raise funds to begin a fusion program at Swansea, and instead began applying the mathematics of the dynamics of particles in plasma to the movement of E. coli in response to the gradients of nutrients.

Thonemann retired from Swansea in 1984 but continued to live in the town until his death on 10 February 2018, aged 100. He had two children, a son and daughter, with his wife Jean.
