= Intermediate-Current Stability Experiment =

Experimental tokamak

ICSE
Intermediate-Current Stability Experiment
- Device type: Stabilized toroidal Z-pinch
- Location: Culham, Oxfordshire, United Kingdom
- Affiliation: UKAEA Culham

Technical specifications
- Plasma current: 1.5 MA

History
- Year(s) of operation: –present
- Preceded by: ZETA

The Intermediate-Current Stability Experiment (ICSE, pronounced "ice") was a fusion power device designed in the United Kingdom in the late 1950s. It was to have been built at the newly opened AEA Culham center for fusion research, but was cancelled in the summer of 1960 when the ever-rising budget led to further investigations of the theoretical basis of the machine that suggested it did not have a high chance of being successful.

ICSE was a response to the failure of the earlier ZETA design. ZETA produced neutrons in 1957 which were interpreted as a sign of successful fusion reactions. Further research demonstrated they were not, that the neutrons were the result of instabilities in the plasma, something that had been seen before on earlier devices and should have been more seriously considered here. The claims of fusion had to be retracted in a humiliating May 1958 release, which cast a pall over the entire fusion field.

That research, along with general studies of plasma stability in toroidal designs, suggested that the system would be stable if everything occurred much more rapidly and had a particular magnetic layout. Instead of pulses that lasted about 1,500 microseconds in ZETA, pulses in ICSE would last only 25 microseconds. It was believed this would cause the current induced in the plasma to flow only into the outer layer of the plasma, creating a magnetic field which would be much more stable than one that flowed through the entire body of the plasma.

Construction of the buildings for ICSE had just begun when a number of theoretical arguments were raised that suggested there was no real reason to believe it would be more successful than ZETA. Combined with an ever-increasing price tag, the project was soon in trouble. When William Penny heard one more particularly worrying theoretical problem with the concept, he cancelled development in August 1960, and Culham moved on to other experiments.

== History ==
=== ZETA ===
UK researchers were among the first to seriously consider the topic of controlled fusion, dating to the immediate post-war era. With the worldwide news reporting following the announcement of Argentina's fusion project, the UK atomic labs were able to quickly set up a fusion program. Over the next two years, early work quickly focussed their efforts on a concept today known as z-pinch, in which a large transformer is used to induce an electrical current in a plasma of a suitable fusion fuel - which at the time was pure deuterium. Two teams were formed, one at the Atomic Energy Research Establishment (AERE) at Harwell, and a second at the Atomic Weapons Establishment (AWRE) in Aldermaston.

By the mid-1950s, this program had advanced to the point of discovering a number of serious problems related to the stability of the plasma when a current was running through it. This led to some consternation, but was almost immediately resolved by new work by teams in the US, and especially the work of Marshall Rosenbluth. This led to a second round of machines at both sites using the so-called "stabilized pinch", which showed a great improvement in performance. With some confidence that the stabilized pinch design solved the earlier problems, the researchers at Harwell pressed for funding to construct a much larger machine. This emerged as ZETA, by far the largest and most powerful fusion machine in the world at that time. They became so confident of its success that early planning for an even more powerful machine, ZETA II, began as early as 1957.

Shortly after ZETA was first turned on, test runs using deuterium began to generate neutrons. Over the next months, the team was increasingly convinced they had succeeded in creating fusion, even though there were a number of reasons to believe this was not the case. In January 1958, the results were announced to the world - fusion was no longer just for bombs and although much more development was needed, a fusion-powered future appeared inevitable. Over the next few months, it became clear that there was a serious problem with the results. Temperature measurements that suggested the plasma was very hot were inaccurate and the plasma was nowhere near what was required of fusion. More in-depth testing revealed yet another class of current-driven instabilities that were causing the neutrons.

=== ZETA II ===
Before the issues with ZETA were known, even before construction had completed, plans for ZETA II were advancing. It was, essentially, a version of ZETA with much more powerful magnets and pinch currents. There was the belief that this machine might approach break-even conditions, and thus be a model for future commercialization. This led to extensive discussions about where such a device would be built, and who might build it. Harwell was running out of room for machines, and if the new design was going to be much larger it would be difficult to find the space. Moreover, the number of people working on it would make management of the site difficult. If the system was going to be a commercial prototype, then it seemed it should be built at AEA Winfrith, a larger site were a number of experimental fission reactors were being built, and if it was going to be turned over to industry, then perhaps Metropolitan-Vickers should pay a larger share of the costs.

These decisions ran into a firestorm of protest inside Harwell. Some felt that they were nowhere near a production concept, regardless of any projected performance on ZETA, and it was too early to push development to industry. Others noted that the Winfrith site was remote to the point that none of the physicists who worked on the theory side would want to move there, nor would the ones that stayed back be easily available to those that did move. While there was agreement that Harwell would be too small, there was very little support for a move as far as Winfrith to solve that. Further confusion ensued when John Cockcroft announced he was retiring from the executive role in the AEA's Research Group, leading to many of the people important to the ZETA effort moving chairs within the establishment.

After much confusion, during which the problems with ZETA became clear, the ultimate decision was to move any future machines from Harwell to a new location today known as the Culham Centre for Fusion Energy. This was only a short distance from Harwell, making the travel issues minor, as well as being near Oxford University which provided ample manpower and theory support.

=== Post-ZETA ===
As the problems in ZETA became clear, ZETA II was immediately re-assessed and ultimately cancelled. This occurred around the time of the second Atoms for Peace meeting in the fall of 1958. At this meeting, a number of new concepts were presented that had been previously unknown, notably the stellarator and magnetic mirror. But all of these showed problems of one sort or another, and there was some level of doom and gloom over the events and the field descended into what was known as "the doldrums."

On their return from Atoms for Peace, the teams at Harwell and AWRE were asked to come up with their plans for the future. The AWRE was particularly impressed by the mirror concept, especially as it had low particle density and they felt tat would make it easier to make detailed theoretical studies of its behaviour. Keith Roberts and John Bryan Taylor, previously working on the UK hydrogen bomb program, had moved to the controlled fusion side and suggested a mirror machine known as "Phoenix". To take advantage of a power supply they had recently constructed for a larger pinch machine, in July 1958 they also suggested building a theta pinch system they called a thetatron.

Harwell felt they had invested too a great an effort in the toroidal pinch concept to move to entirely new concepts. They began looking for solutions to the stability issues in ZETA, with an eye to using as much of the ZETA II work as possible. After some consideration, they selected another modification of the pinch concept that emerged from Rosenbluth's earlier work. There were two key concepts. One was to apply the pinch very rapidly, so that it was confined only to the outer layer of the plasma. The other was to reverse the external stabilizing field after the current was induced.

=== ICSE ===
Cockcroft and his designated replacement Basil Schonland, reconstituted the CTR Advisory Committee with several new physicists. At their first meeting on 18 December 1958, a number of papers were presented by AERE, AWRE and Associated Electrical Industries (AEI), the holding company for Metropolitan-Vickers. A number of reviews of international work were also presented. After agreeing that Harwell should begin preparations for a large new machine, starting with the required power supply, the detailed design was put off.

Peter Thonemann presented a paper on 12 February 1959, "Proposals for Zeta 1, Zeta 2 and Pandora (Garbo)", which led to an impromptu meeting by many of the Harwell researchers. The minutes of this meeting contain the first mention of the name ICSE. Thonemann states that the purpose of the experiment is to answer whether or not "is the toroidal pinch discharge stable" and "is the energy loss to the walls calculated from binary collision theory?" He suggested that this experiment replace Zeta 2, and if it was successful, a new Zeta 2 would be based on it. William Penney asked for a more detailed description to be presented at an upcoming meeting.

The 21 March 1959 meeting, chaired by Penney and attended by Cockcroft, Schonland and D.W. Fry from the management side, and Thonemann, George Paget Thomson, Bas Pease and Roy Bickerton from the experimental team. By this time they had split the concept into two stages, ICSE(a) which would re-use an aluminum torus from Zeta but lack the field reversal and have a current limited to about 0.5 megaampre, and ICSE(b), which would have the originally planned ceramic torus, field reversal, and a 1.5 MA current. The two, together, would cost 1.25 million pounds.

The request was made formal in April and approved by the Atomic Energy Authority in May and the Treasury, at 1.5 million, in July. Schonland stated at the time that "It is the unanimous opinion of Sir John Cockcroft, Sir William Penney and myself that the right policy is to plan on putting ICSE at Cuiham Airfield as soon as possible".

=== Budget problems ===
By this time the team had been studying the physics for three months, and engineering started under D. L. Smart. They spent the rest of the year on detailed design, which led to price increases. In October, Schonland asked for an updated price "guestimate", and Pease suggested it was 2.1 million. Schonland was shocked, and complained "I am used to shocks but this is a [deleted] and presumably not the end." By the time the study was complete in the spring of 1960, the price had indeed risen further, and now stood at 2.5 million pounds. To Penney and Schonland, this demonstrated a pattern of rising cost that seemed to have no apparent end.

Roger Makins had taken over as the chair of the AEA in January. Around this time, an unrelated AEA project had greatly overrun its budget, and Makins asked Penney to produce a budget for all of the projects in the Research Group, which was dominated by ICSE. They produced a new price of 3.2 million, and then that August, 4 million. This estimate has been debated ever since. Whether or not it was correct, it fed into an AEA decision to limit the funding of the fusion program, which made the Harwell management begin scrapping other projects to save ICSE. John Bertram Adams, who had been selected to run the new center at Culham, was inclined to cut the project simply to allow other projects to survive.

=== Cancellation ===
Brian Flowers was the former head of the theoretical physics division at Harwell, but had left in 1958 to take a position at the University of Manchester. He had returned to Harwell for a visit, and at the end of January 1960 he relayed to Cockcroft his opinion that the physics team had doubts about whether or not ICSE could successfully create the conditions needed to meet the stability criterion. Cockcroft immediately relayed this to Penney, who talked to Flowers' replacement, W.L. Lomer. Lomer said he had faith in the concept, as did Thompson, Bickerton and Pease.

Faced with these concerns, Penney asked outside observers for their opinions, including James Chadwick and Keith Roberts. Roberts, who had performed computerized calculations as part of the H-bomb work, considered the theoretical basis for ICSE to be flimsy and didn't believe the magnetic configuration needed would actually be created in the device. Unlike the rest of the opinions, Roberts presented a complete theoretical analysis suggesting this was the case. Earlier theory had not considered the resistive effects in the plasma, and Penney saw this as a serious oversight.

For a final consideration, Penney invited Adams and Pease to his house to discuss the matter. Adams agreed with the general idea that the Harwell group should focus on theory for the immediate period and not jump directly into building a new large-scale experiment. However, he expressed his concern that this might lead to the budget for Culham being cut, and Penney assured him this would not be the case. When asked, Pease expressed his disappointment, but also saw some advantages and eventually gave his support. Penney later wrote:

It was agreed that Adams would explain the decisions to the fusion staff and that I would ask the Authority to approve the cancellation of ICSE.

—

The cancellation was approved in August 1960, and was announced publicly in September. Lord Hailsham, the Minister for Science, had the embarrassing problem of having to announce the cancellation of the move to Winfrith in favour of Culham to support ICSE, and now the cancellation of the very project that made such a move a requirement.

The cancellation was also a disappointment internationally. Arthur Edward Ruark, the director of research in the United States Atomic Energy Commission (AEC), only heard about it from his Soviet counterparts while visiting Russia, and did not know for sure until the public announcement in September. He was disturbed that the cancellation might cause AEC managers in the US to subject their program to similar scrutiny.

=== Aftermath ===
Within the management of the AEA, the cancellation of ISCE was viewed with satisfaction. With this, the AWRE's smaller program immediately took the initiative. When the first laboratory plans for Culham were revealed in January 1961, the Phoenix mirror and thetatron programs were both expanded, and the construction of the fast-switching capacitor-based power supply allowed them to take a leadership position in this field for some time.

== Description ==
Fusion devices are based on a fuel of hot gas known as a plasma. Being a hot gas, the fuel naturally wants to expand according to the ideal gas law. If it touches any other object, the plasma will cool and fusion will be difficult to create. Some form of "confinement" is needed to keep the fuel away from material objects.

ZETA was based on a simple plasma confinement concept, the z-pinch. When a current flows in a conductor, a magnetic field is created that is directed into the inside of the conductor. With very high currents, this force can be enough to crush the conductor, which had first been noted in hollow lightning rods. The idea is to run a large current in the plasma and use this pinch effect to keep it from expanding. In this case it had the added benefit of the current rapidly heating the plasma, and that temperature being greatly magnified as the density increased. Although this would not be enough to heat the plasma to commercially useful figures in the range of 50 million Kelvin, it would get into the 5 million range which would be very useful for experiments.

A simple way to do this is to use a linear tube with electrodes at either end, similar to a fluorescent lamp, but this would be subject to erosion in an operational machine as the hot fuel hit the plates. This was not a concern for experimental machines, however, and teams in the US and USSR both worked with these devices to characterize the fusion reactions. The UK teams solved this problem by bending the tube around into a circle and using an external magnet to induce the current in the plasma, leaving the fuel to circulate around the tube without hitting any objects.

Pinch systems were among the simplest of the early fusion concepts, and saw experimentation at many locations. All of these quickly found that the plasma was unstable. As the current built up, any slight imperfections in the magnetic field being created would interact with the field around it and cause "kinks" to develop that eventually pushed the plasma into the sides of the containers. All of the machines exhibited these problems, and in the case of the Soviet machines, neutrons were produced when these eddies caused the fuel ions to be ejected at very high energies and knock neutrons out of the walls of the container.

Several theoreticians were studying this issue, and Martin David Kruskal and Vitaly Shafranov independently developed similar solutions to explain this kink instability even before these devices went into operation. Marshall Rosenbluth started with this work and began considering ways to fix it. In late 1955 be published two basic outlines. One, stabilized pinch, used external magnets to impart a field into the plasma before pinching. The idea was that the field would extend into the plasma only a short distance, and be "frozen in" during the pinch, giving the plasma a "backbone". This turned out to work, but as ZETA demonstrated, new "microinstabilies" were formed that were just as effective at ruining confinement.

Much of this was traced to the fields in the plasma not being similar to those described by Rosenbluth, which assumed the field would only be in a thin layer on the outside. Measurements showed this was not the case, and the external field extended almost to the center. This led to Rosenbluth's second concept, the basis for ICSE, where the external field would be reverse in direction as the pinch was being applied. The idea was to limit the time the field had to travel into the plasma, while still having a strong field during the pinch.

To arrange this, ICSE proposed to use a torus made of a ceramic material that would be largely transparent to the external magnetic field and would thus not slow its spread into the interior. The initial field would be set up as it had been in ZETA, using a series of ring-shaped magnets encircling the torus. These would be powered before the pinch. To reverse the field, a metal casing around the ceramic would be connected to a second power supply that would turn on at the right instant. This would create a field not unlike the one in the plasma itself, but running in the opposite direction.

The ICSE(b) model, which included all of the Rosenbluth features, would have a torus with a major diameter of 6 metres (20 ft), about the same as ZETA. The power supply contained 10 MJ of capacitors running at 100 kV. Originally intended to be housed in one of the wartime aircraft hangars, on inspection they were in much worse condition than believed. This led to the construction of a new building, D-1, and a long office building running down the former runway beside it.
