= ZETA (fusion reactor) =

Experimental fusion reactor in the United Kingdom

Coordinates: 51.5799°N 1.3082°W

Zero Energy Thermonuclear Assembly
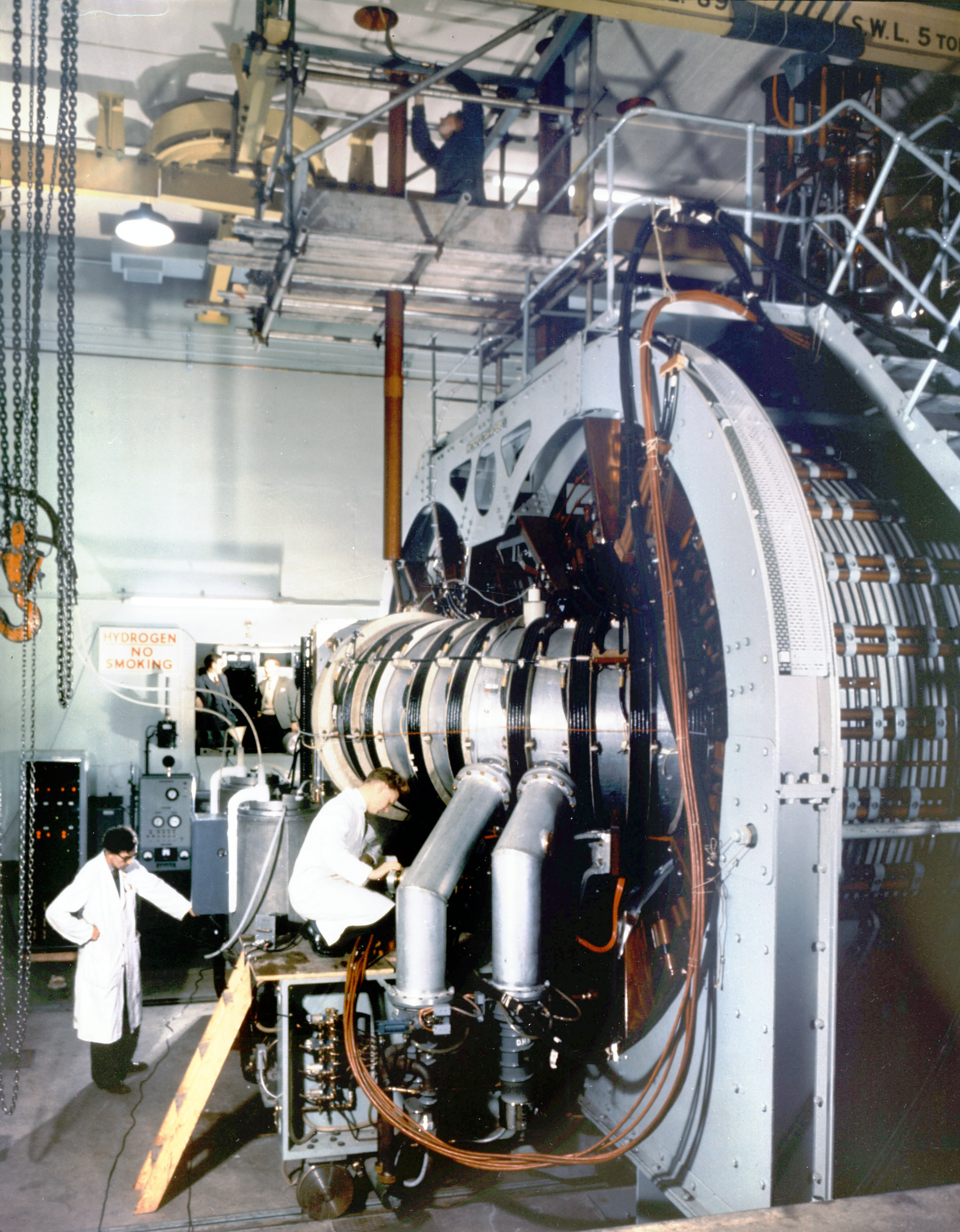
- Toroidal confinement tube centred and larger magnets for producing pinch current.
- Device type: Stabilized toroidal Z-pinch
- Location: Harwell, United Kingdom
- Affiliation: Atomic Energy Research Establishment

Technical specifications
- Major radius: 1.16 m
- Minor radius: 0.5 m
- Magnetic field: 0.61 T
- Plasma current: 250–900 kA
- Plasma temperature: < 200 eV

History
- Date(s) of construction: 1956
- Year(s) of operation: 1957–1968
- Succeeded by: ICSE

ZETA (Zero Energy Thermonuclear Assembly) was a major early fusion experiment. It was a toroidal pinch built at the UK Atomic Energy Research Establishment. ZETA was larger and more powerful than any fusion machine in the world until the mid 1960s. Its goal was to produce a measurable rate of fusion reactions, although it was not large enough to produce net energy.

It started operation in August 1957 and quickly detected neutrons, a by-product of fusion. The fuel temperature was believed to be 1-5 million degrees, enough for fusion. The result was leaked to the press in September 1957. It was reported worldwide as a greater scientific accomplishment than the Soviet Sputnik. U.S. and Soviet experiments had detected similar neutron bursts at temperatures too low for fusion, justifying skepticism. Improved measurements found ZETA temperatures had been overestimated. The laboratory had to publicly clarify that ZETA had not achieved fusion, embarrassing the fusion research field. The neutrons were due to plasma instabilities that actually impeded steady state fusion.

Despite ZETA's failure to achieve fusion early, its experiments still produced important advances. The use of lasers to accurately measure plasma temperature was developed on ZETA, and later used to confirm the high performance of the Soviet T-3 tokamak. ZETA runs also showed the plasma self-stabilised after the power was turned off, leading to the reversed field pinch concept. A larger successor was proposed, but cancelled in 1960. ZETA itself continued in operation until 1968.

== Concept ==
Fusion reactions were first achieved by scientists in the laboratory in 1934 using a particle accelerator. Fusion reaction cross sections could thus be measured, showing fusion power with deuterium needed a fuel temperature of 5-100 keV. Since this is so hot it would melt any known material, a requirement for steady state fusion is to contain the fuel without touching the walls.

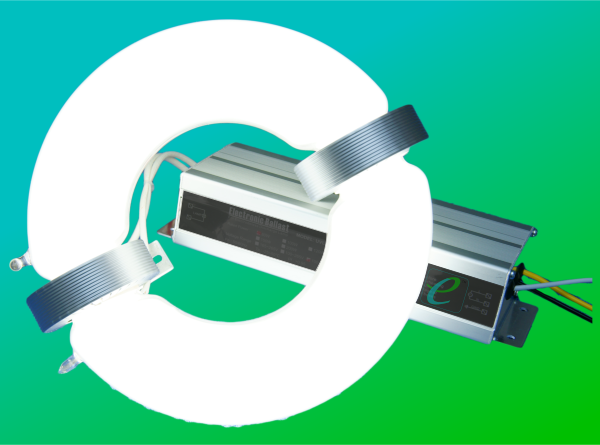
A modern induction lamp is a low-temperature version of a toroidal plasma tube. At these temperatures the plasma can hit the tube walls without harm; further confinement is not needed.

At such temperatures the deuterium gas becomes a plasma, which is electrically conductive and subject to electric and magnetic fields. In a magnetic field, the electrons and nuclei orbit the magnetic field lines, which allows them to be used to contain the gas without touching the walls. A further development was to bend a magnetic tube into a donut shape, or torus, so that the hot plasma fuel does not flow out the ends.

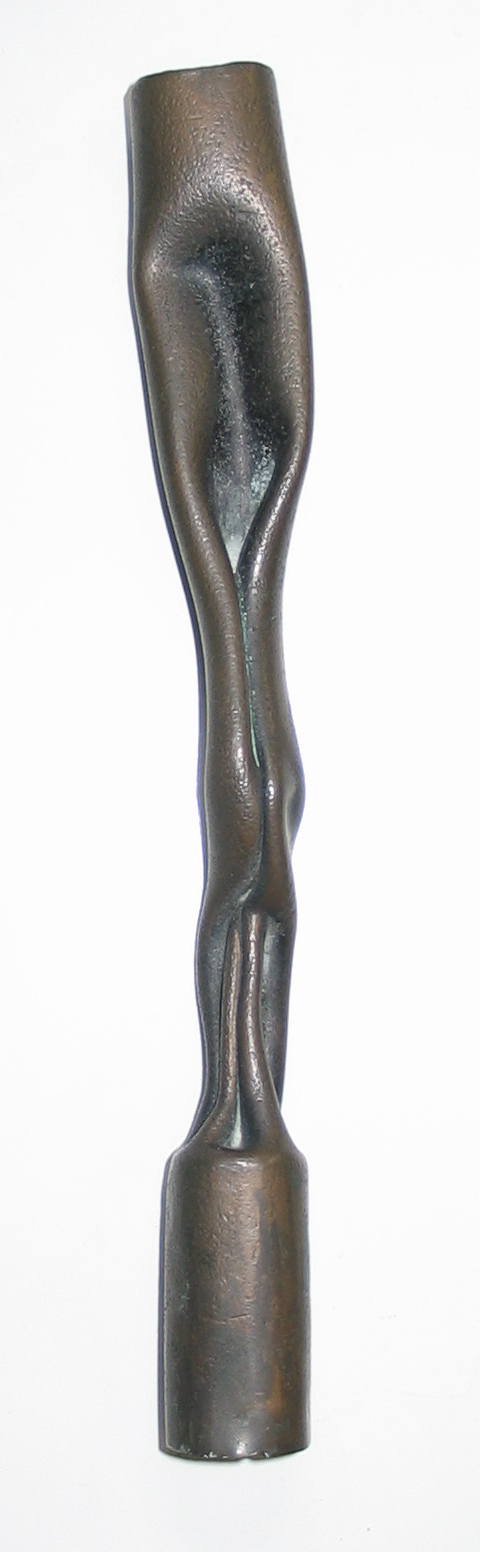
This lightning rod was crushed when a large current passed through it. Studying this phenomenon led to the discovery of the pinch effect.

George Paget Thomson and Moses Blackman patented a machine for containing the hot deuterium fuel with magnetic fields in 1946. It would be heated by microwaves to 500 million K. The current in the plasma also heated it in pulses. Such a machine would demand a very large power supply. At that time, the Atomic Energy Research Establishment declined to fund its development.

Thomson's graduate students at Imperial College, Alan Ware, built a small machine out of old radar equipment and was able to induce powerful currents, but could not measure the temperature of the plasma. Thomson continued to pressure the government to allow him to build a full-scale device. Meanwhile, James L. Tuck convinced Norris Bradbury, the director of Los Alamos, to fund a pinch machine from the lab's own budget, the Perhapsatron. This was the world's first pinch machine.

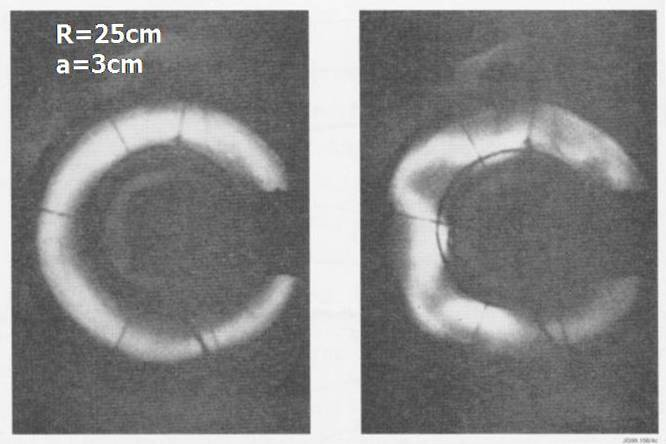
A photograph of the kink instability in an early experiment at Aldermaston. The dark rectangle on the right is the induction magnet.

By early 1952 there were numerous pinch devices in operation, including Sceptre and the Marks I through Mark IV at Harwell in the UK. In the U.S., Tuck built his Perhapsatron in January 1952. It was later learned that Fuchs had passed the UK work to the Soviets, and that they had started a fusion programme as well.

All found that current caused the plasma column to become unstable and break up, later identified as the 'kink' and 'sausage' instabilities. They were found to have the same underlying mechanism. Two early approaches to stabilising it were to wrap the vacuum tube in conductive metal, and to add additional electromagnets wrapped around the vacuum tube.

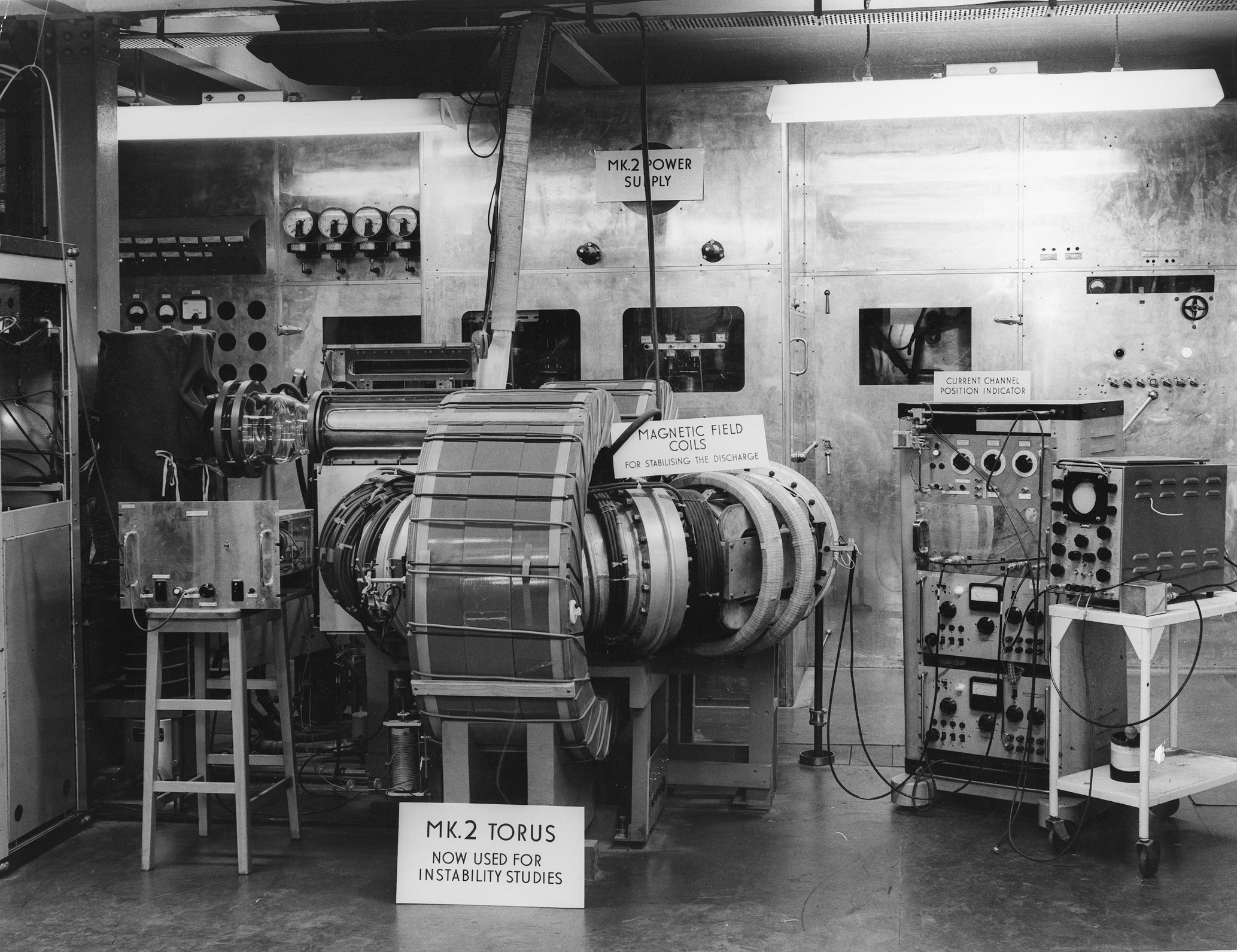
To test the basic concept of stabilised pinch, additional magnets were added to the earlier Mark 2 Torus, seen here as the wires wound around the vacuum chamber.

The magnetic fields from these magnets mixed with the pinch field created by the current in the plasma. The result was that the paths of the particles within the plasma tube were no longer purely circular around the torus, but twisted like the stripes on a barber's pole. In the U.S., this concept was known as giving the plasma a "backbone", suppressing small-scale, localised instabilities. Calculations showed that this stabilised pinch would dramatically improve confinement times, and the older concepts "suddenly seemed obsolete". Marshall Rosenbluth, Arianna W. Rosenbluth and Richard Garwin predicted from plasma theory that for particular parameters of the physical size of the reactor, the power of the stabilising magnets and the amount of pinch, such toroidal machines appeared to be naturally stable. This was the concept underlying ZETA.

== History ==
=== ZETA construction ===
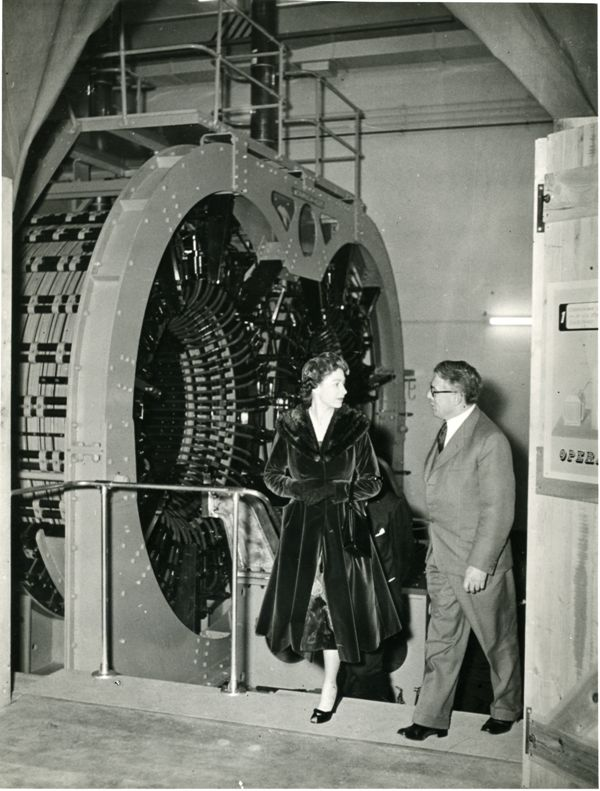
Elizabeth II, guided by UKAEA Research Director John Cockcroft, visits the ZETA fusion reactor while it is under construction. The main induction magnet dominates the left side of the image, the toroidal vacuum chamber has not yet been installed.

U.S. researchers planned to test both fast pinch and stabilised pinch by modifying their existing small-scale machines. In the UK, Thomson once again pressed for funding for a larger machine. This time he was much more warmly received, and initial funding of £200,000 was provided in late 1954. Design work continued during 1955, and in July the project was named ZETA. The term "zero energy" was a phrase used in the nuclear industry to refer to small research reactors, like ZEEP, which had a role similar to ZETA's goal of producing reactions while releasing no net energy.

The ZETA design was finalised in early 1956. Metropolitan-Vickers was hired to build the machine, which included a 150 tonne pulse transformer, the largest built in Britain to that point. A serious issue arose when the required high-strength steels needed for the electrical components were in short supply, but a strike in the U.S. electrical industry caused a sudden glut of material, resolving the problem.

ZETA was the largest and most powerful fusion device in the world at the time of its construction. (Note: A review of all the machines presented in Geneva in 1958 describes ZETA as having a major radius of 160 cm. The next largest machine was 100, and the next 62, both built after ZETA. The rest were much smaller.) Its aluminium torus had an internal bore of 1 metre (3 ft 3 in) and a major radius of 1.6 metres (5 ft 3 in), over three times the size of any machine built to date. It was also the most powerful design, incorporating an induction magnet that was designed to induce currents up to 100,000 amperes (amps) into the plasma. Later amendments to the design increased this to 200,000 amps. It included both types of stabilisation; its aluminium walls acted as the metal shield, and a series of secondary magnets ringed the torus. Windows placed in the gaps between the toroidal magnets allowed direct inspection of the plasma.

In July 1954, the AERE was reorganised into the United Kingdom Atomic Energy Authority (UKAEA). Modifications to Harwell's Hangar 7 in order to house the machine began that year. Despite its advanced design, the price tag was modest: about US$1 million. (Note: In comparison to ZETA's ~US$1 million price, the contemporary Model C stellarator was US$23 million.) By late 1956 it was clear that ZETA was going to come online in mid-1957, beating the Model C stellarator and the newest versions of the Perhapsatron and Columbus. Because these projects were secret, based on the little information available the press concluded they were versions of the same conceptual device, and that the British were far ahead in the race to produce a working machine.

=== Soviet visit and the push to declassify ===
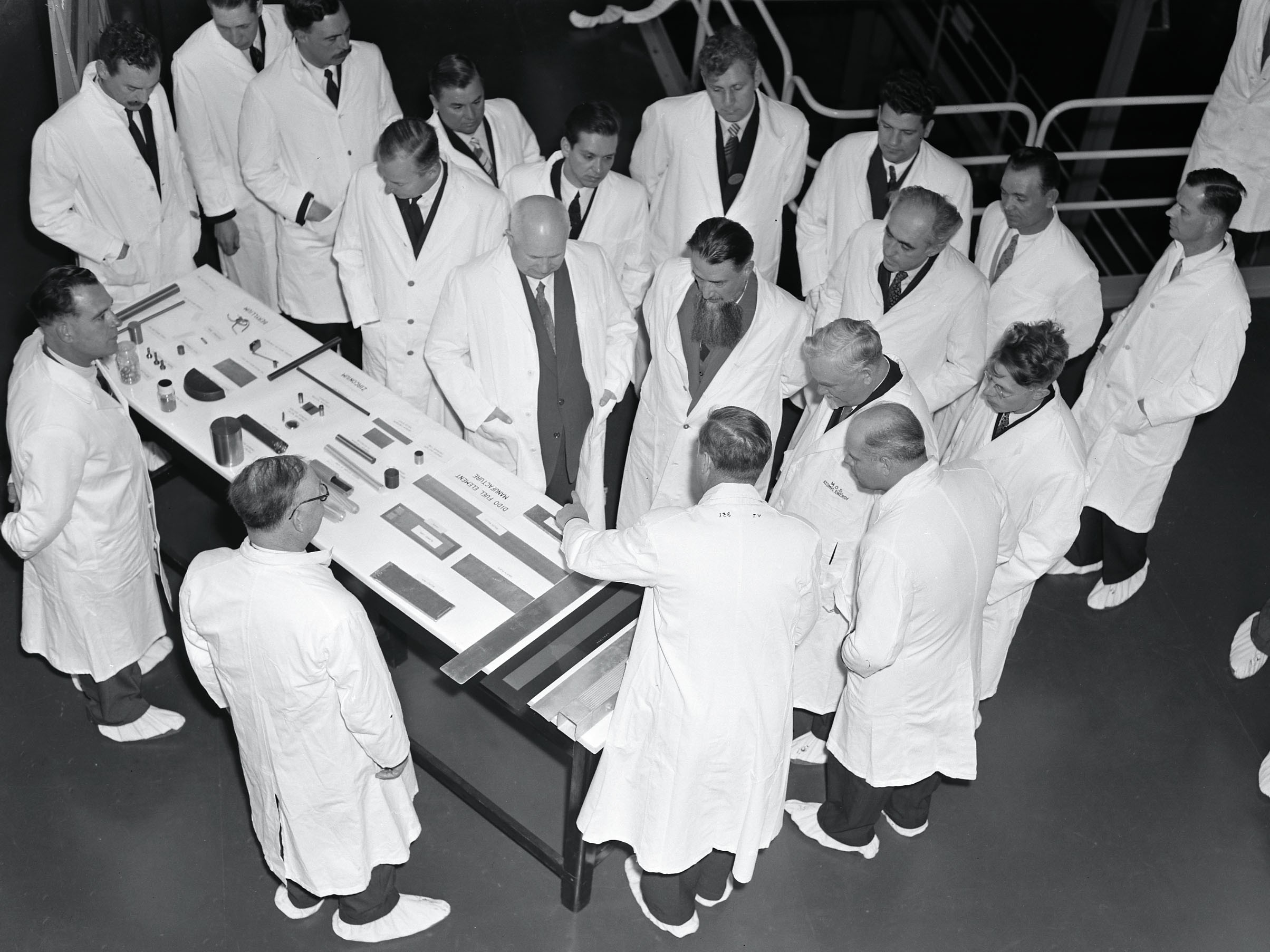
Khrushchev (roughly centred, bald), Kurchatov (to the right, bearded), and Bulganin (to the right, white-haired) visited Harwell on 26 April 1956. Cockcroft stands across from them (in glasses), while a presenter points to mockups of various materials being tested in the newly opened DIDO reactor.

From 1953 the U.S. had increasingly concentrated on the fast pinch concept. Some of these machines had produced neutrons, and these were initially associated with fusion. There was so much excitement that several other researchers quickly entered the field as well. Among these was Stirling Colgate, but his experiments quickly led him to conclude that fusion was not taking place. According to Spitzer resistivity, the temperature of the plasma could be determined from the current flowing through it. When Colgate performed the calculation, the temperatures in the plasma were far below the requirements for fusion.

This being the case, some other effect had to be creating the neutrons. Further work demonstrated that these were the result of instabilities in the fuel. The localised areas of high magnetic field acted as tiny particle accelerators, causing reactions that ejected neutrons. Modifications attempting to reduce these instabilities failed to improve the situation and by 1956 the fast pinch concept had largely been abandoned. The U.S. labs began turning their attention to the stabilised pinch concept, but by this time ZETA was almost complete and the US was well behind.

In 1956, while planning a well publicised state visit by Nikita Khrushchev and Nikolai Bulganin to the UK, the Harwell researchers received an offer from Soviet scientist Igor Kurchatov to give a talk. They were surprised when he began his talk on "the possibility of producing thermonuclear reactions in a gaseous discharge". Kurchatov's speech revealed the Soviet efforts to produce fast pinch devices similar to the American designs, and their problems with instabilities in the plasmas. Kurchatov noted that they had also seen neutrons being released, and had initially believed them to be from fusion. But as they examined the numbers, it became clear the plasma was not hot enough and they concluded the neutrons were from other interactions.

Kurchatov's speech made it apparent that the three countries were all working on the same basic concepts and had all encountered the same sorts of problems. Cockcroft missed Kurchatov's visit because he had left for the U.S. to press for declassification of the fusion work to avoid this duplication of effort. There was a widespread belief on both sides of the Atlantic that sharing their findings would greatly improve progress. Now that it was known the Soviets were at the same basic development level, and that they were interested in talking about it publicly, the US and UK began considering releasing much of their information as well. This developed into a wider effort to release all fusion research at the second Atoms for Peace conference in Geneva in September 1958.

In June 1957 the UK and U.S. finalised their agreement to release data to each other sometime prior to the conference, which both the UK and the U.S. planned on attending "in force". The final terms were reached on 27 November 1957, opening the projects to mutual inspection, and calling for a wide public release of all the data in January 1958.

=== Early results ===
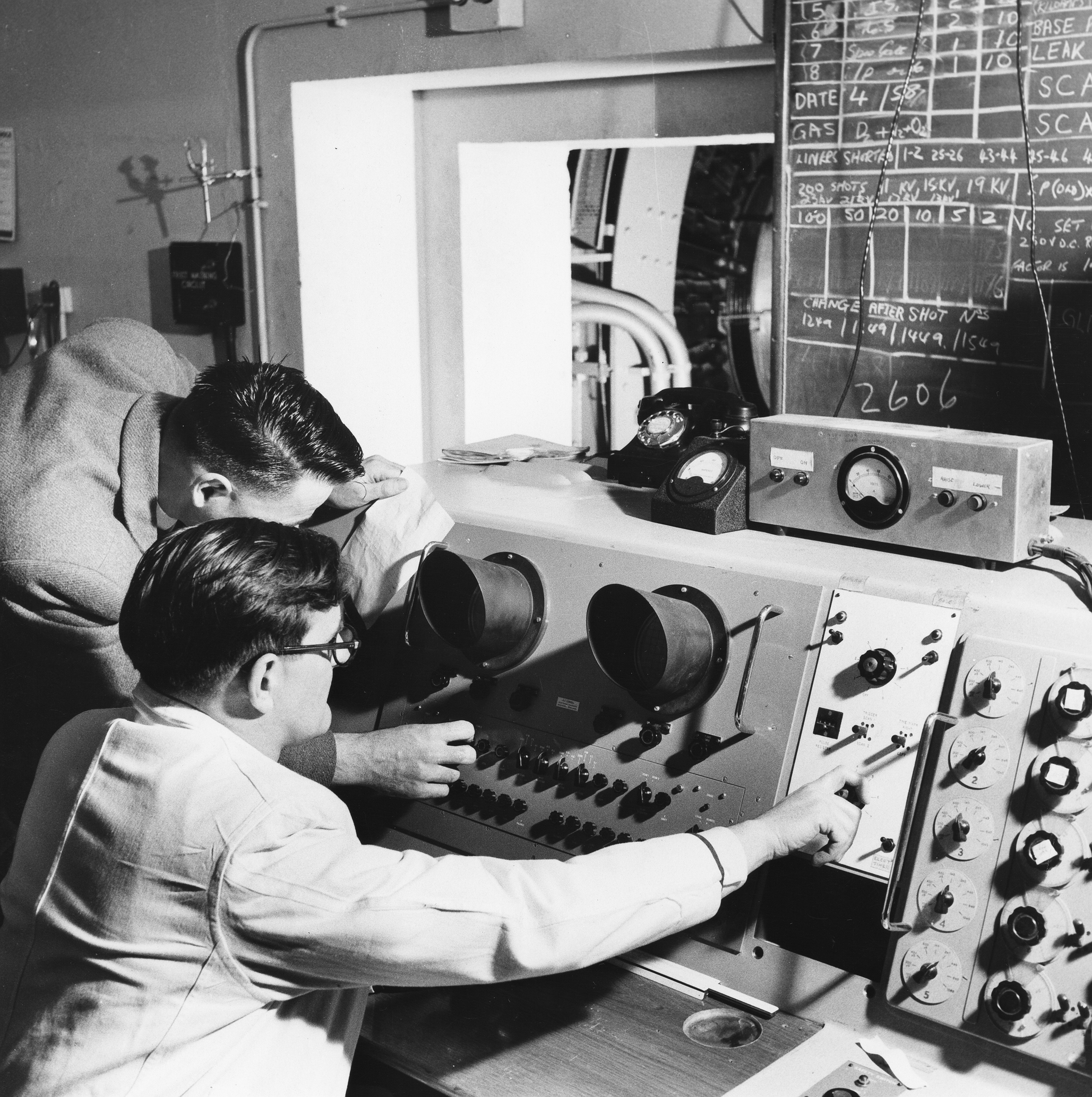
A "shot" using deuterium is being prepared at the operator's station. Peter Thonemann is in the foreground. The reactor can be seen through the window.

ZETA started operation in mid-August 1957, initially with hydrogen. These runs demonstrated that ZETA was not suffering from the same stability problems that earlier pinch machines had seen and their plasmas were lasting for milliseconds, up from microseconds, a full three orders of magnitude improvement. The length of the pulses allowed the plasma temperature to be measured using spectroscopy; although the light emitted was broadband, the Doppler broadening of spectral lines of impurities in the plasma led to calculable temperatures.

Even in early experimental runs, the team started introducing deuterium gas into the mix and began increasing the current to 200,000 amps. On the evening of 30 August the machine produced huge numbers of neutrons, on the order of one million per experimental pulse, or "shot". An effort to duplicate the results and eliminate possible measurement failure followed.

Much depended on the temperature of the plasma; if the temperature was low, the neutrons would not be fusion related. Spectrographic measurements suggested plasma temperatures between 1 and 5 million K; at those temperatures the predicted rate of fusion was within a factor of two of the number of neutrons being seen. It appeared that ZETA had reached the long-sought goal of producing small numbers of fusion reactions, as it was designed to do.

U.S. efforts had suffered a string of minor technical setbacks that delayed their experiments by about a year; both the new Perhapsatron S-3 and Columbus II did not start operating until around the same time as ZETA despite being much smaller experiments. Nevertheless, as these experiments came online in mid-1957, they too began generating neutrons. By September, both these machines and a new design, DCX at Oak Ridge National Laboratory, appeared so promising that Edward Gardner reported that:

…there is a distinct possibility that either the machine at Oak Ridge or the one at Los Alamos will have confirmed by January 1958 the production of thermonuclear neutrons.

=== Leaked claims of achieving fusion ===
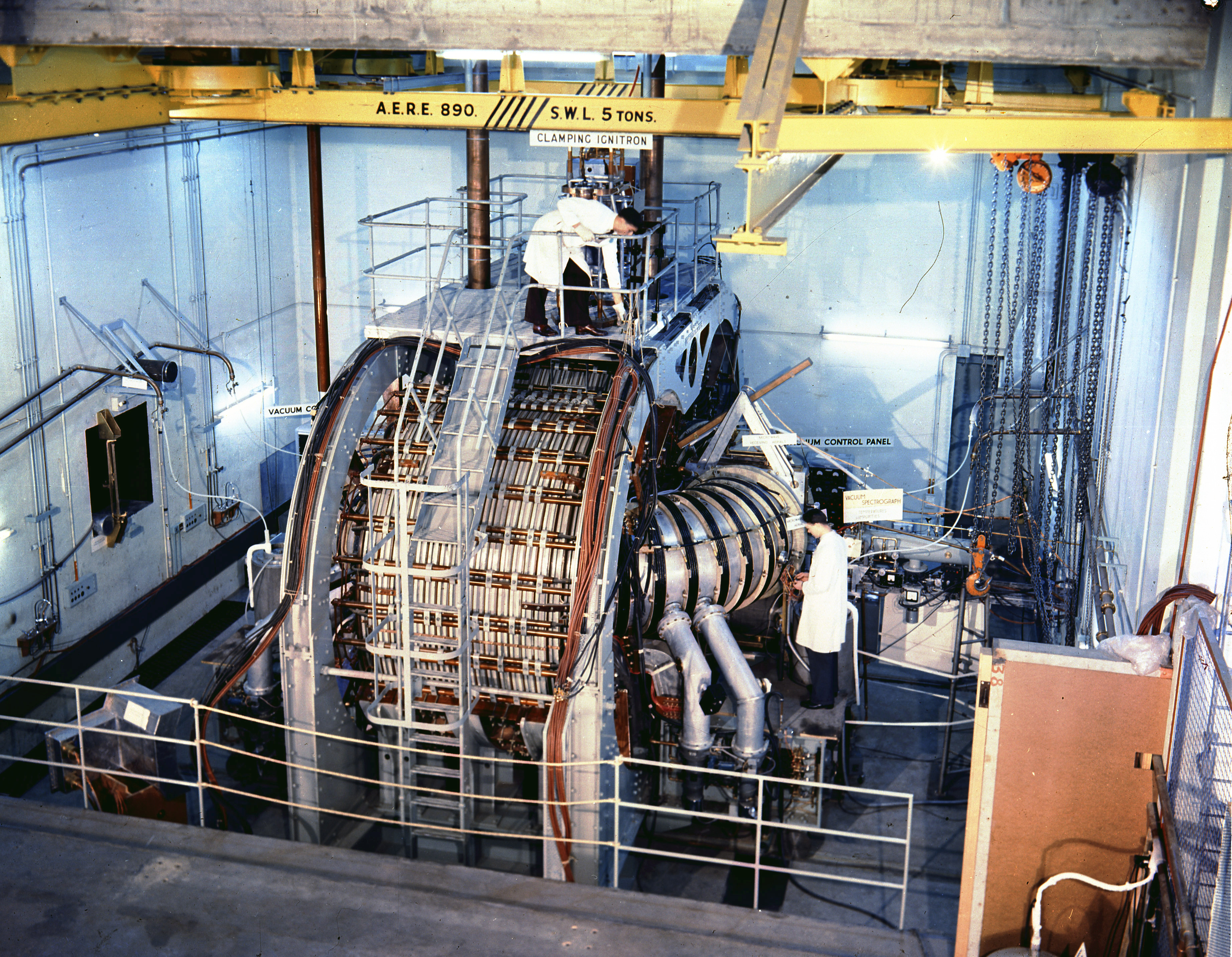
ZETA as seen from above in late 1957

The news was too good to keep bottled up. Tantalising leaks started appearing in September. In October, Thonemann, Cockcroft and William P. Thompson hinted that interesting results would be following. In November a UKAEA spokesman noted "The indications are that fusion has been achieved". Based on these hints, the Financial Times dedicated an entire two-column article to the issue. Between then and early 1958, the British press published an average of two articles a week on ZETA. Even the U.S. papers picked up the story; on 17 November The New York Times reported on the hints of success.

Although the British and the U.S. had agreed to release their data in full, at this point the overall director of the U.S. program, Lewis Strauss, decided to hold back the release. Tuck argued that the field looked so promising that it would be premature to release any data before the researchers knew that fusion was definitely taking place. Strauss agreed, and announced that they would withhold their data for a period to check their results.

As the matter became better known in the press, on 26 November the publication issue was raised in House of Commons. Responding to a question by the opposition, the leader of the house announced the results publicly while explaining the delay in publication due to the UK–U.S. agreement. The UK press interpreted this differently, claiming that the U.S. was dragging its feet because it was unable to replicate the British results.

Things came to a head on 12 December when a former member of parliament, Anthony Nutting, wrote a New York Herald Tribune article claiming:

Some people have suggested darkly to me that the real reason for this American reluctance to have this momentous news released is politics. They point to the loss of prestige which the Administration would suffer if they had to admit that Britain, as well as Russia, was ahead of America in scientific development. I prefer to believe this attitude stems from a slavish and misguided application of security. But, whatever may be the reason, it shows a deplorable misconception in Washington of the true meaning of Western partnership and the real nature of the Soviet threat.

The article resulted in a flurry of activity in the Macmillan administration. Having originally planned to release their results at a scheduled meeting of the Royal Society, there was great concern over whether to invite the Americans and Soviets, especially as they believed the Americans would be greatly upset if the Soviets arrived, but just as upset if they were not invited and the event was all-British. The affair eventually led to the UKAEA making a public announcement that the U.S. was not holding back the ZETA results, but this infuriated the local press, which continued to claim the U.S. was delaying to allow them to catch up. (Note: Hill covers the furore over the release in considerable depth.)

=== Early concerns ===
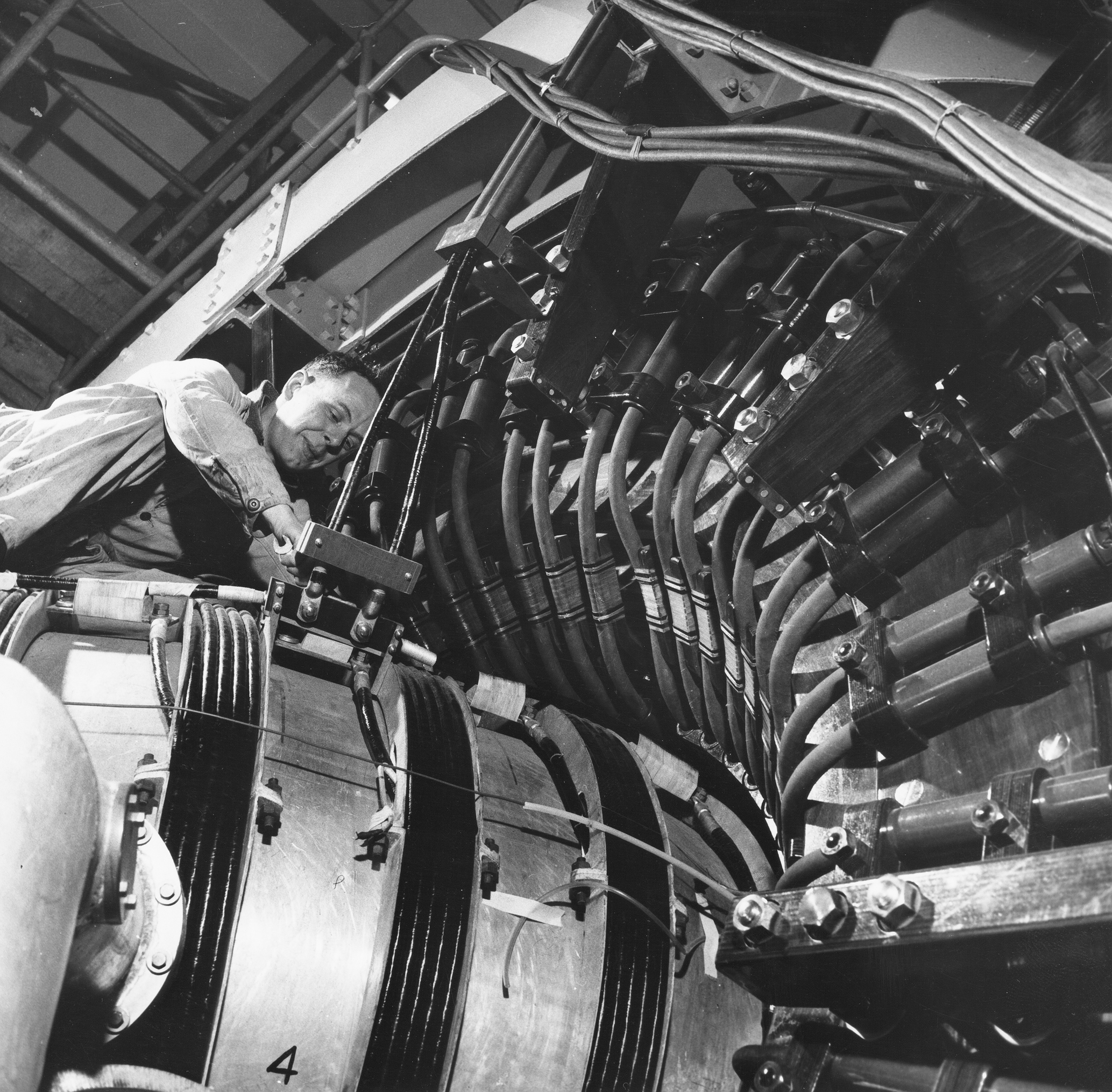
Close-up of the ZETA reactor while undergoing maintenance. The main toroidal vacuum chamber is in the lower left, wound around by the current cables of the stabilising magnets. The larger device on the right is the main induction magnet, which created the pinch current in the plasma.

When the information-sharing agreement was signed in November a further benefit was realised: teams from the various labs were allowed to visit each other. The U.S. team, including Stirling Colgate, Lyman Spitzer, Jim Tuck and Arthur Edward Ruark, all visited ZETA and concluded there was a "major probability" the neutrons were from fusion.

On his return to the U.S., Spitzer calculated that something was wrong with the ZETA results. He noticed that the apparent temperature, 5 million K, would not have time to develop during the short firing times. ZETA did not discharge enough energy into the plasma to heat it to those temperatures so quickly. If the temperature was increasing at the relatively slow rate his calculations suggested, fusion would not be taking place early in the reaction, and could not be adding energy that might make up the difference. Spitzer suspected the temperature reading was not accurate. Since it was the temperature reading that suggested the neutrons were from fusion, if the temperature was lower, it implied the neutrons were non-fusion in origin.

Colgate had reached similar conclusions. In early 1958, he, Harold Furth and John Ferguson started an extensive study of the results from all known pinch machines. Instead of inferring temperature from neutron energy, they used the conductivity of the plasma itself, based on the well-understood relationships between temperature and conductivity. They concluded that the machines were producing temperatures perhaps 1/10 what the neutrons were suggesting, nowhere near hot enough to explain the number of neutrons being produced, regardless of their energy.

By this time the latest versions of the US pinch devices, Perhapsatron S-3 and Columbus S-4, were producing neutrons of their own. The fusion research world reached a high point. In January, results from pinch experiments in the U.S. and UK both announced that neutrons were being released, and that fusion had apparently been achieved. The misgivings of Spitzer and Colgate were ignored.

=== Public release of fusion claim, worldwide interest ===
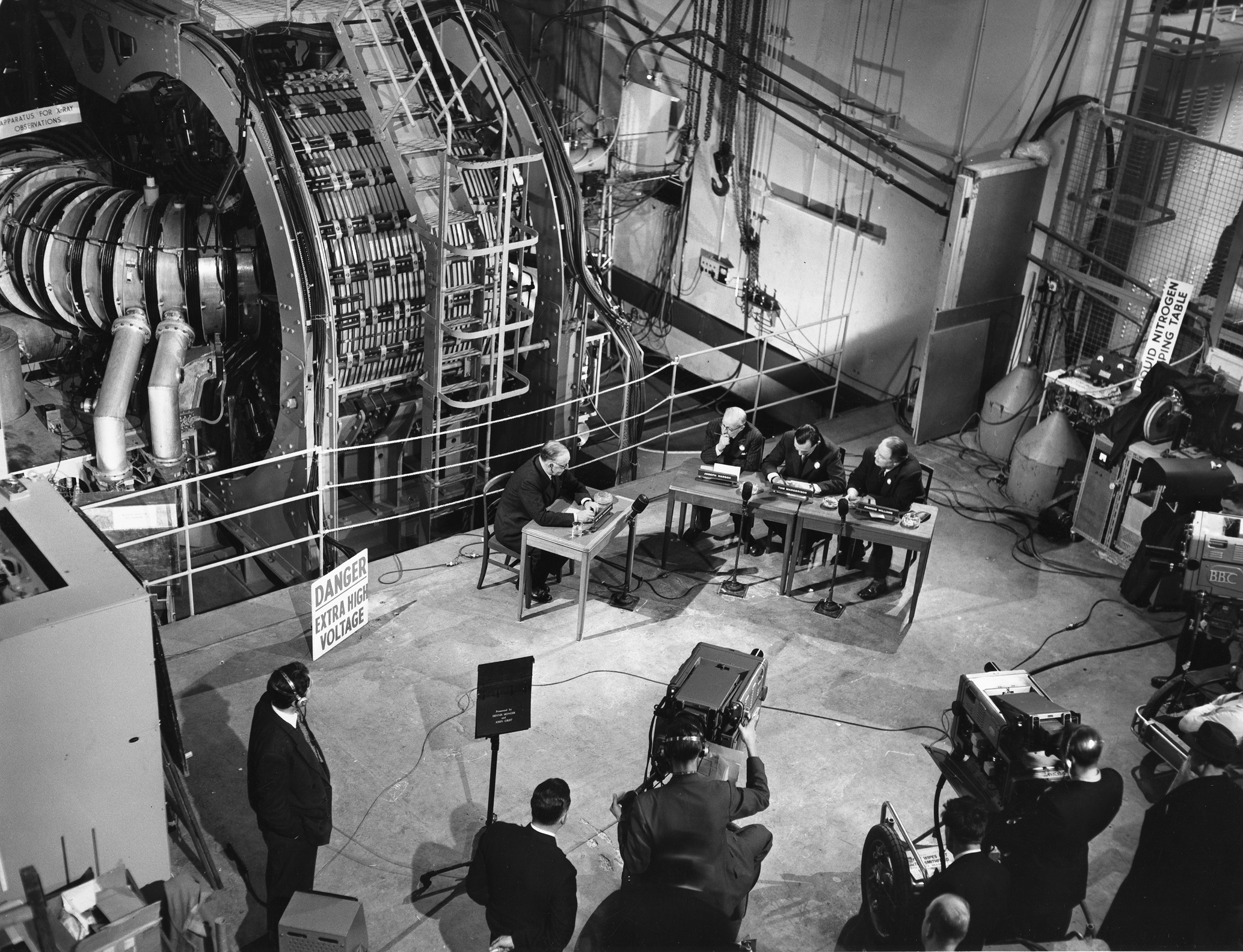
A team of reporters asks Cockcroft (centre) questions about ZETA. It was during this interview that Cockcroft offered his assessment that he was 90% sure the neutrons seen from the device were caused by fusion.

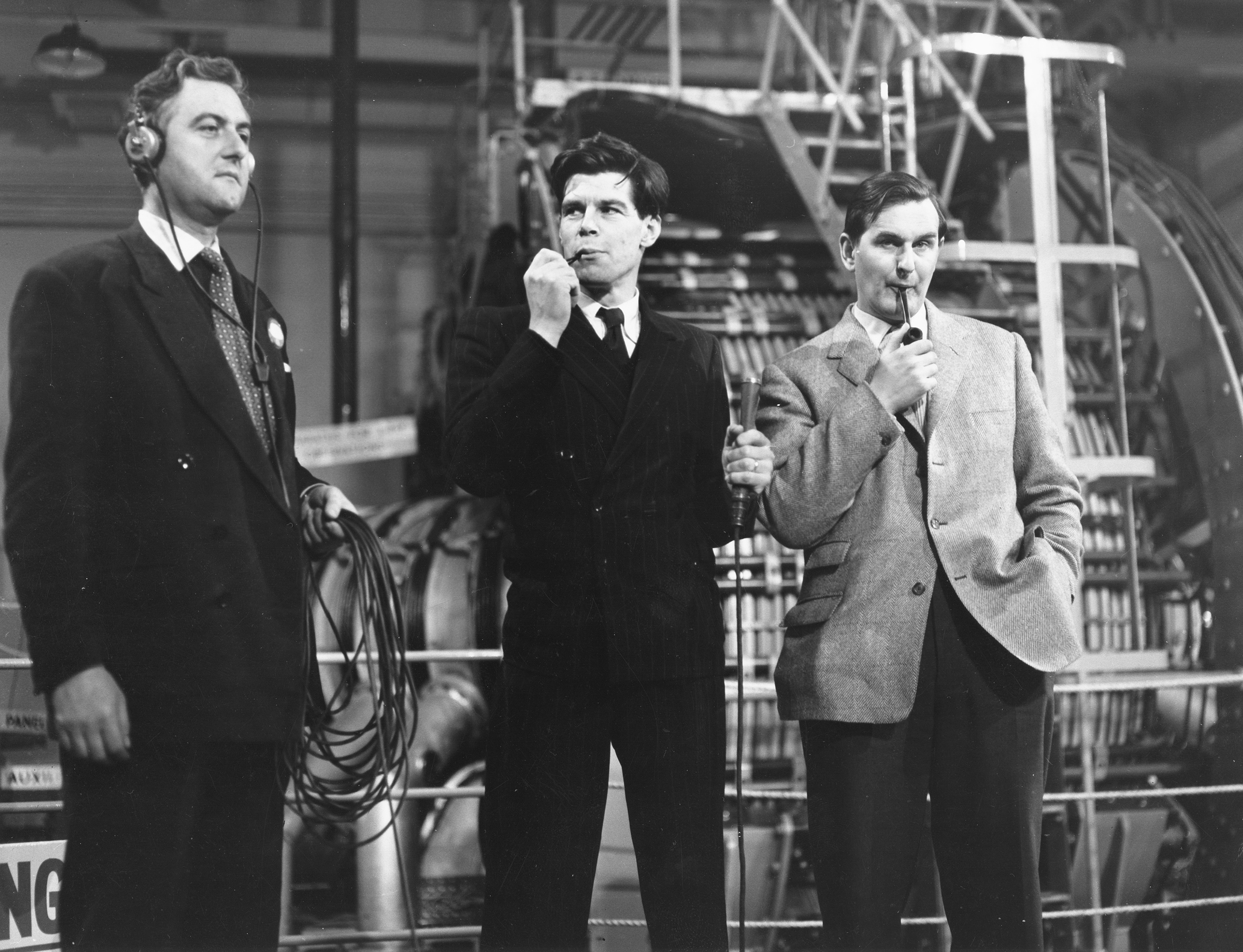
Bas Pease (centre) and Bob Carruthers (right) are interviewed by the BBC in front of the ZETA reactor.

The ZETA release was front-page news around the world.

The long-planned release of fusion data was announced to the public in mid-January. Considerable material from the UK's ZETA and Sceptre devices was released in depth in the 25 January 1958 edition of Nature, which also included results from Los Alamos' Perhapsatron S-3, Columbus II and Columbus S-2. The UK press was livid. The Observer wrote that "Admiral Strauss' tactics have soured what should be an exciting announcement of scientific progress so that it has become a sordid episode of prestige politics."

The results were typical of the normally sober scientific language, and although the neutrons were noted, there were no strong claims as to their source. The day before the release, Cockcroft, the overall director at Harwell, called a press conference to introduce the British press to the results. Some indication of the importance of the event can be seen in the presence of a BBC television field crew, a rare occurrence at that time. He began by introducing the fusion programme and the ZETA machine, and then noted:

In all experiments on toroidal discharges neutrons have been observed in about the numbers to be expected if thermonuclear reactions were proceeding. It is well known, however, from previous experiments carried out in Russian and other laboratories that instabilities in the current channel can give rise to strong electric fields which accelerated deuterons and can produce neutrons. So in no case have the neutrons been definitely proved to be due to the random motion of the deuterium associated with a temperature on the order of five million degrees ... Their origin, will, however, become clear as soon as the number of neutrons produced can be increased by increasing current and temperatures.

— John Cockcroft, 24 January 1958

The reporters at the meeting were not satisfied with this assessment and continued to press Cockcroft on the neutron issue. After being asked several times, he eventually stated that in his opinion, he was "90 percent certain" they were from fusion. This was unwise; a statement of opinion from a Nobel prize winner was taken as a statement of fact. The next day, the Sunday newspapers were covered with the news that fusion had been achieved in ZETA, often with claims about how the UK was now far in the lead in fusion research. Cockcroft further hyped the results on television following the release, stating: "To Britain this discovery is greater than the Russian Sputnik."

As planned, the U.S. also released a large batch of results from their smaller pinch machines. Many of them were also giving off neutrons, although ZETA was stabilised for much longer periods and generating more neutrons, by a factor of about 1000. When questioned about the success in the UK, Strauss denied that the U.S. was behind in the fusion race. When reporting on the topic, The New York Times chose to focus on Los Alamos' Columbus II, only mentioning ZETA later in the article, and then concluded the two countries were "neck and neck." Other reports from the U.S. generally gave equal support to both programmes. Newspapers from the rest of the world were more favourable to the UK; Radio Moscow went so far to publicly congratulate the UK while failing to mention the U.S. results at all.

As ZETA continued to generate positive results, plans were made to build a follow-on machine. The new design was announced in May; ZETA II would be a significantly larger US$14 million machine whose explicit goal would be to reach 100 million K, and generate net power. This announcement gathered praise even in the US; The New York Times ran a story about the new version. Machines similar to ZETA were being announced around the world; Osaka University announced their pinch machine was even more successful than ZETA, the Aldermaston team announced positive results from their Sceptre machine costing only US$28,000, and a new reactor was built in Uppsala University that was presented publicly later that year. The Efremov Institute in Leningrad began construction of a smaller version of ZETA, although still larger than most, known as Alpha.

=== Retraction of fusion claims ===
Spitzer had already concluded that known theory suggested that the ZETA was nowhere near the temperatures the team was claiming, and during the publicity surrounding the release of the work, he suggested that "Some unknown mechanism would appear to be involved". Other researchers in the U.S., notably Furth and Colgate, were far more critical, telling anyone who would listen that the results were bunk. In the Soviet Union, Lev Artsimovich rushed to have the Nature article translated, and after reading it, declared "Chush sobachi!" (bullshit).

Cockcroft had stated that they were receiving too few neutrons from the device to measure their spectrum or their direction. Failing to do so meant they could not eliminate the possibility that the neutrons were being released due to electrical effects in the plasma, the sorts of reactions that Kurchatov had pointed out earlier.

In fact, such measurements would have been easy to make. In the same converted hangar that housed ZETA was the Harwell Synchrocyclotron effort run by Basil Rose. This project had built a sensitive high-pressure diffusion cloud chamber as the cyclotron's main detector. Rose was convinced it would be able to directly measure the neutron energies and trajectories.

In a series of experiments in February and March 1958, he showed that the neutrons had a high directionality, at odds with a fusion origin which would be expected to be randomly directed. To further demonstrate this he had the machine run with the current in the discharge current running "backwards". Had the neutrons been from fusion, the net velocity should have been zero, that is, they should have been travelling in random directions. The measurements showed this was not the case, not only was there a clear directionality to their release, it reversed when the current was reversed. This suggested the neutrons were a result of the electric current itself, not fusion reactions inside the plasma. They also noted that the energy of the neutrons was extremely close to that of a D-D fusion reaction, which suggested that the source was D particles colliding with a solid in the reactor.

This was followed by similar experiments on Perhapsatron and Columbus, demonstrating the same problems. The issue was a new form of instability, the "microinstabilities" or MHD instabilities, that were caused by wave-like signals in the plasma. These had been predicted, but whereas the kink was on the scale of the entire plasma and could be easily seen in photographs, these microinstabilities were too small and rapidly moving to easily detect, and had simply not been noticed before. But like the kink, when these instabilities developed, areas of enormous electrical potential developed, rapidly accelerating protons in the area. These sometimes collided with neutrons in the plasma or the container walls, ejecting them through neutron spallation. This is the same physical process that had been creating neutrons in earlier designs, the problem Cockcroft had mentioned during the press releases, but their underlying cause was more difficult to see and in ZETA they were much more powerful. The promise of stabilised pinch disappeared.

Cockcroft was forced to publish a humiliating retraction on 16 May 1958, claiming "It is doing exactly the job we expected it would do and is functioning exactly the way we hoped it would." Le Monde raised the issue to a front-page headline in June, noting "Contrary to what was announced six months ago at Harwell – British experts confirm that thermonuclear energy has not been 'domesticated'". The event cast a chill over the entire field; it was not only the British who looked foolish, every other country involved in fusion research had been quick to jump on the bandwagon.

=== Later operation and proposed successors ===
Beginning in 1955, Cockcroft had pressed for the establishment of a new site for the construction of multiple prototype power-producing fission reactors. This was strongly opposed by Christopher Hinton, and a furious debate broke out within the UKAEA over the issue. (Note: The arguments between Cockcroft and Hinton were widespread, varied, and went on throughout the 1950s.) Cockcroft eventually won the debate, and in late 1958 the UKAEA formed AEE Winfrith in Dorset, where they eventually built several experimental reactor designs.

Cockcroft had also pressed for the ZETA II reactor to be housed at the new site. He argued that Winfrith would be better suited to build the large reactor, and the unclassified site would better suit the now-unclassified research. This led to what has been described as "as close to a rebellion that the individualistic scientists at Harwell could possibly mount". Thonemann made it clear he was not interested in moving to Dorset and suggested that several other high-ranking members would also quit rather than move. He then went on sabbatical to Princeton University for a year. The entire affair was a major strain on Basil Schonland, who took over the Research division when Cockcroft left in October 1959 to become the Master of the newly formed Churchill College, Cambridge.

While this was taking place, the original ZETA II proposal had been growing ever-larger, eventually specifying currents as powerful as the Joint European Torus that was built years later. As it seemed this was beyond the state-of-the-art, the project was eventually cancelled in February 1959. A new proposal soon took its place, the Intermediate-Current Stability Experiment (ICSE). ICSE was designed to take advantage of further stabilising effects noticed in M-theory, which suggested that very fast pinches would cause the current to flow only in the outer layer of the plasma, which should be much more stable. Over time, this machine grew to be about the same size as ZETA; ICSE had a 6 m major diameter and 1 m minor diameter, powered by a bank of capacitors storing 10 MJ at 100 kV.

Harwell was as unsuited to ICSE as it was for ZETA II, so Schonland approached the government with the idea of a new site for fusion research located close to Harwell. He was surprised to find they were happy with the idea, as this would limit employment at Harwell, whose payroll roster was becoming too complex to manage. Further study demonstrated that the cost of building a new site would be offset by the savings in keeping the site near Harwell; if ICSE was built at Winfrith, the travel costs between the sites would be considerable. In May 1959, the UKAEA purchased RNAS Culham, about 10 miles (16 km) from Harwell. ICSE construction began later that year, starting with a one-acre building to house it, known as "D-1".

Meanwhile, work continued on ZETA to better understand what was causing the new forms of instabilities. New diagnostic techniques demonstrated that the electron energies were very low, on the order of 10 eV (approximately 100,000 K) while ion temperatures were somewhat higher at 100 eV. Both of these pointed to a rapid loss of energy in the plasma, which in turn suggested the fuel was turbulent and escaping confinement to hit the walls of the chamber where it rapidly cooled. A full presentation of the results was made at the Salzburg Conference in 1961, where the Soviet delegation presented very similar results on their ZETA-clone, Alpha.

The source of this turbulence was not clearly identified at that time, but the team suggested it was due to current-driven resistive modes; if one did not use the simplifying assumption that the plasma had no macroscopic resistance, new instabilities would naturally appear. When the new head of the UKAEA, William Penney, heard that the ICSE design was also based on the resistance-free assumption, he cancelled the project in August 1960. Parts for the partially-assembled reactor were scavenged by other teams.

Thonemann had returned by this point and found much to disagree with on ICSE. He demanded to be allowed to set up a new fusion group to remain at Harwell on ZETA. ZETA remained the largest toroidal machine in the world for some time, and went on to have a productive career for just over a decade, but in spite of its later successes ZETA was always known as an example of British folly.

== Tokamak temperature measurement with ZETA Thompson scattering ==
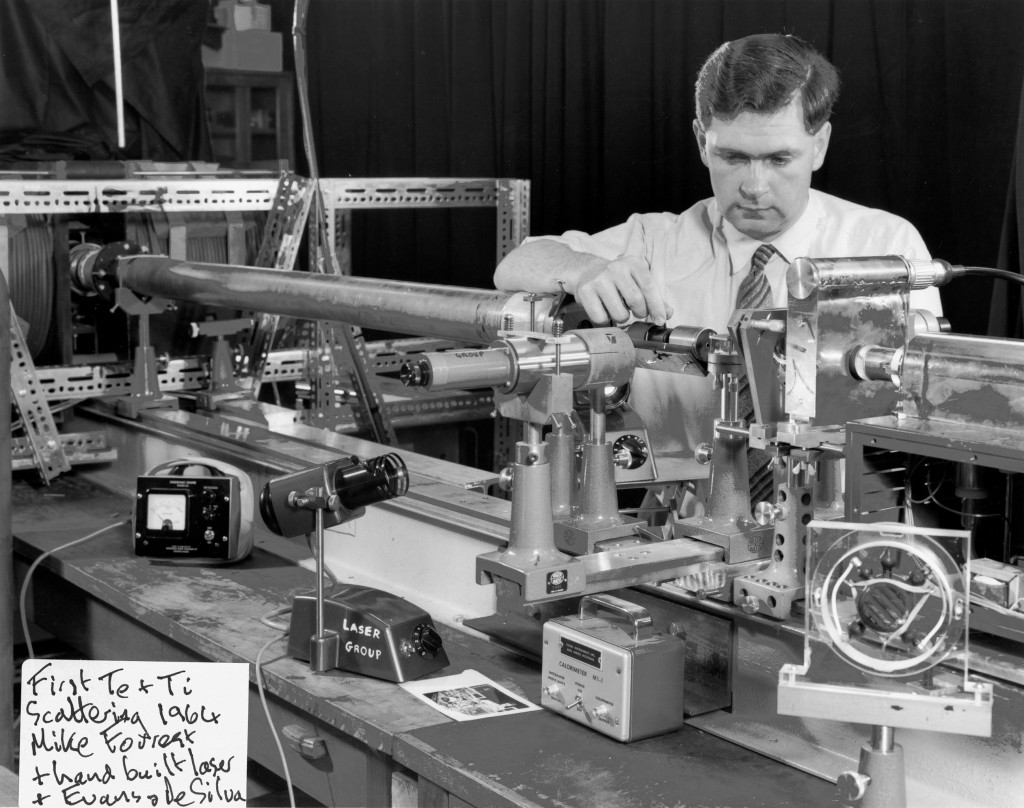
Mike Forrest operates a hand-built laser that is part of a Thomson scattering system used to measure temperatures in ZETA. This became a major diagnostic technique in the fusion field, used to this day.

ZETA's failure was due to limited information; using the best available measurements, ZETA was returning several signals that suggested the neutrons were due to fusion. The original temperature measurements were made by examining the Doppler broadening of the spectral lines of the atoms in the plasma. The inaccuracy of the measurement and spurious results caused by electron impacts with the container led to misleading measurements based on the impurities, not the plasma itself. Over the next decade, ZETA was used continuously in an effort to develop better diagnostic tools to resolve these problems.

This work eventually developed a method that is used to this day. The introduction of lasers provided a new solution through Thomson scattering. Lasers have extremely accurate and stable frequency control, and the light they emit interacts strongly with free electrons. A laser shone into the plasma will be reflected off the electrons, and during this process will be Doppler-broadened by the electrons' movement. The speed of the electrons is a function of their temperature, so by comparing the frequency before and after collisions, the temperature of the electrons could be measured with an extremely high degree of accuracy. By "reversing" the system, the temperature of the ions could also be directly measured.

Through the 1960s ZETA was not the only experiment to suffer from unexpected performance problems. Problems with plasma diffusion across the magnetic fields plagued both the magnetic mirror and stellarator programs, at rates that classical theory could not explain. Adding more fields did not appear to correct the problems in any of the existing designs. Work slowed dramatically as teams around the world tried to better understand the physics of the plasmas in their devices. Pfirsch and Schluter were the first to make a significant advance, suggesting that much larger and more powerful machines would be needed to correct these problems. An attitude of pessimism took root across the entire field.

In 1968 a meeting of fusion researchers took place in Novosibirsk, where, to everyone's astonishment, the Soviet hosts introduced their work on their tokamak designs which had performance numbers that no other experiment was even close to matching. The latest of their designs, the T-3 tokamak, was producing electron energies of 1000 eV, compared to about 10 eV in ZETA. This corresponded to a plasma temperature of about 10 million K. Although the Soviet team was highly respected, the results were so good that there was serious concern their indirect temperature measurements might be unreliable and they had fallen prey to a measurement problem like the one that had occurred with ZETA. Spitzer, once again, expressed his scepticism rather strongly, sparking off an acrimonious debate with Artsimovich.

The Soviets were equally concerned about this, and even though it was the height of the Cold War, Artsimovich invited UKAEA to bring their laser system to the Kurchatov Institute and independently measure the performance. Artsimovich had previously called their system "brilliant." The team became known as "the Culham five", performing a series of measurements in late 1968 and early 1969. The resulting paper was published in November 1969 and convinced the fusion research field that the tokamak was indeed reaching the levels of performance the Soviets claimed. The result was a "veritable stampede" of tokamak construction around the world, and it remains the most studied device in the fusion field.

Tokamaks are toroidal pinch machines. The key difference is the relative strengths of the fields. In the stabilised pinch machines, most of the magnetic field in the plasma was generated by the current induced in it. The strength of the external stabilisation fields was much lower and only penetrated into the outer layers of the plasma mass. The tokamak reversed this; the external magnets were much more powerful and the plasma current greatly reduced in comparison. Artsimovich put it this way:

The longitudinal field intensity must be many times greater than the intensity of the azimuthal field produced by the current. This constitutes the principal difference between tokamak devices and systems with relatively weak longitudinal fields, such as the well-known English Zeta device.

This difference is today part of a general concept known as the safety factor, denoted q. It has to be greater than one to maintain stability during a discharge; in ZETA it was about 1/3. A ZETA-type machine could reach this q, but would require enormously powerful external magnets to match the equally large fields being generated by the current. The tokamak approach resolved this by using less pinch current; this made the system stable but meant the current could no longer be used to heat the plasma. Tokamak designs require some form of external heating.

== Reversed field pinch ==
In 1965, the newly opened Culham laboratory hosted what had become a periodic meeting of international fusion researchers. Of all the work presented, only two papers on stabilised pinch were present, both on ZETA. Spitzer did not mention them during the opening comments.

Normally, the pulse of electricity sent into ZETA formed a current pulse with a shape similar to a Poisson distribution, ramping up quickly then trailing off. One of the papers noted that the plasma stability reached a maximum just after the current began to taper off, and then lasted longer than the current pulse itself. Given that the current was there to provide confinement, that the plasma would actually increase in confinement as the current was reduced was entirely unexpected. This phenomenon was dubbed "quiescence".

Three years later, at the same meeting where Soviet results with the T-3 tokamak were first released, a paper by Robinson and King examined the quiescence period. They determined it was due to the original toroidal magnetic field reversing itself, creating a more stable configuration. At the time, the enormity of the T-3 results overshadowed this result.

John Bryan Taylor took up the issue and began a detailed theoretical study of the concept, publishing a groundbreaking 1974 article on the topic. He demonstrated that as the magnetic field that generated the pinch was relaxing, it interacted with the pre-existing stabilising fields, creating a self-stable magnetic field. The phenomenon was driven by the system's desire to preserve magnetic helicity, which suggested a number of ways to improve the confinement time.

Although the stabilising force was lower than the force available in the pinch, it lasted considerably longer. It appeared that a reactor could be built that would approach the Lawson criterion from a different direction, using extended confinement times rather than increased density. This was similar to the stellarator approach in concept, and although it would have lower field strength than those machines, the energy needed to maintain the confinement was much lower. Today this approach is known as the reversed field pinch (RFP) and has been a field of continued study. (Note: A comparison of modern toroidal confinement techniques in Bellan illustrates the close relationship between the RFP and stabilised pinch layout.)

Taylor's study of the relaxation into the reversed state led to his development of a broader theoretical understanding of the role of magnetic helicity and minimum energy states, greatly advancing the understanding of plasma dynamics. The minimum-energy state, known as the "Taylor state", is particularly important in the understanding of new fusion approaches in the compact toroid class. Taylor went on to study the ballooning transformation, a problem that was occurring in the latest high-performance toroidal machines as large-scale waveforms formed in the plasma. His work in fusion research won him the 1999 James Clerk Maxwell Prize for Plasma Physics.

== Demolition ==
Culham officially opened in 1965, and various teams began leaving the former sites through this period. A team kept ZETA operational until September 1968. Hangar 7, which housed ZETA and other machines, was demolished during financial year 2005/2006.
