= Perhapsatron =

Early fusion power device in the 1950s

The Perhapsatron was an early fusion power device based on the pinch concept in the 1950s. Conceived by James (Jim) Tuck while working at Los Alamos National Laboratory (LANL), he whimsically named the device on the chance that it might, perhaps, be able to create fusion reactions.

The first example was built in the winter of 1952/53, and it quickly demonstrated a series of instabilities in the plasma that plagued the pinch concept. A series of modifications followed which attempted to correct these problems, leading to the ultimate "S-4" model. None of these proved fruitful.

== History ==
=== Early fusion efforts ===
Scientists at Los Alamos National Laboratory had a long history of studying nuclear fusion, and by 1946 they had calculated that a steady-state plasma would have to be heated to 100 million degrees Celsius (180 million degrees Fahrenheit) to "ignite" and release net energy. This was of vital interest in the nuclear bomb establishment, where the use of a small atomic bomb "trigger" was used to provide the required temperatures.

Capturing that energy on a smaller industrial scale would not be easy, since plasma at that temperature would melt any physical container. As plasma is electrically conductive it was obvious that it could be contained magnetically, but the proper arrangement of the fields was not obvious. Enrico Fermi pointed out that a simple toroid would cause the fuel to drift out of the "bottle". Several arrangements were studied, notably the stellarator developed around 1950.

=== Z-pinch ===
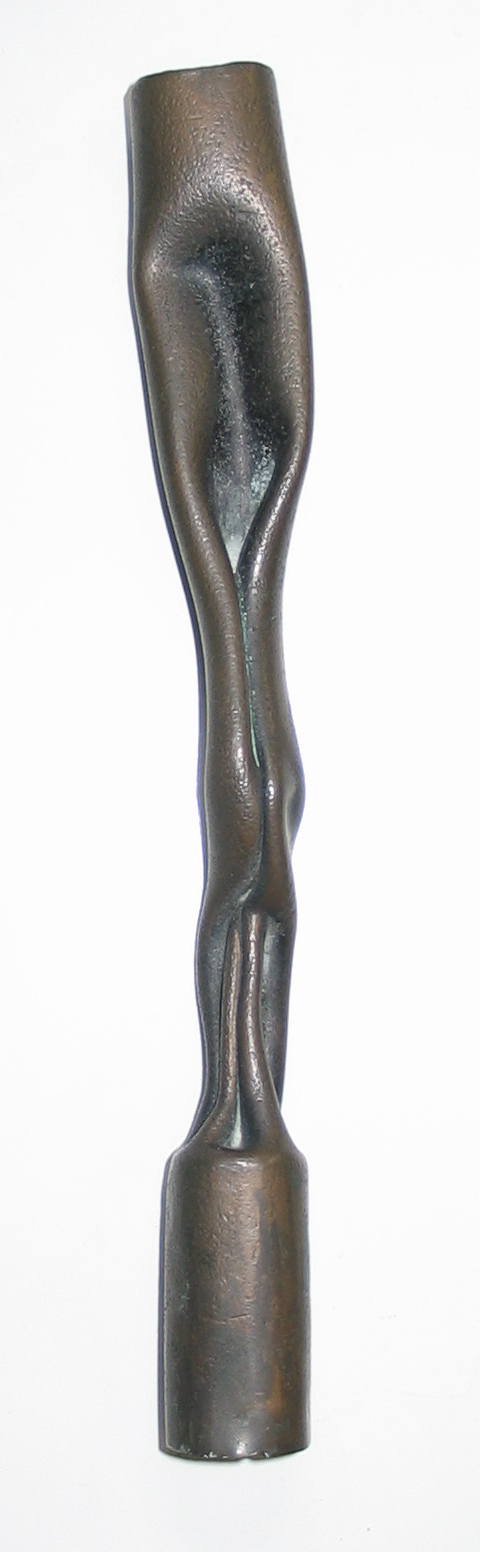
The Lorentz force created by a lightning strike crushed this hollow lightning rod and led to the discovery of the pinch technique.

An alternate approach was the "pinch" concept, developed in the United Kingdom. Unlike the magnetic bottle approaches, in a pinch device, the required magnetic field was created by the plasma itself. Since the plasma is electrically conductive, if one were to run a current through the plasma, it would create an induced magnetic field. This field, through the Lorentz force, will act to compress the conductor. In the case of a plasma, the force would collapse it into a thin filament, "pinching" it. Since the current had to be very large, pinch devices made no attempt to confine the plasmas for extended periods. They would attempt to reach fusion conditions quickly and then extract power from the resulting hot products.

The pinch technique was patented in 1946 by George Paget Thomson and Moses Blackman, who explored both linear and toroidal pinch machines. Jim Tuck was first introduced to these concepts in January 1947, in a meeting arranged at the Atomic Energy Research Establishment, Harwell. Tuck studied the Thomson-Blackman work and concluded that they would not reach fusion condition, but would nevertheless be interesting as an experimental system. Working at the Clarendon Laboratory at Oxford University, he arranged funding for an experimental device and started assembling it. Before it was complete, he was lured to the US by a job offer at the University of Chicago (Illinois).

Other teams in the UK continued their efforts. Thomson passed his concepts on to Stanley (Stan) W. Cousins and Alan Alfred Ware (1924-2010), who assembled a linear pinch device using old radar equipment, and started operations in 1947. Follow-on experiments used large banks of capacitors to store energy that was quickly dumped into the plasma through a solenoid wrapped around a short tube. These experiments demonstrated a number of dynamic instabilities that caused the plasma to break up and hit the walls of the tube long before it was compressed or heated enough to reach the required fusion conditions.

After a short time in Chicago, Tuck was hired by Los Alamos to work on the "Super" project (the hydrogen bomb), where he was put on the task of calculating the nuclear cross section of the deuterium-tritium fusion reaction. This work continued to pique his interest in fusion power, and he spent some time through 1951 considering the problem.

At Los Alamos, Tuck acquainted the US researchers with the British efforts. By this point Lyman Spitzer had introduced his stellarator concept and was talking the idea around the energy establishment, seeking funding. In 1951 he approached the U.S. Atomic Energy Commission (AEC) to fund his design. Tuck was skeptical of Spitzer's enthusiasm and felt his aggressive development program was "incredibly ambitious". Tuck proposed a much less-aggressive program based on pinch. Both men presented their ideas in Washington, D.C., in May 1951. In July, Spitzer received $50,000, and Tuck was sent away without funding. Not to be outdone, Tuck convinced Norris Bradbury, the Los Alamos director, to give him $50,000 from the discretionary budget.

Still unconvinced that the concept would work on the first attempt, he called this approach, with Stanislaw Ulam's input, the Perhapsatron. Tuck assembled a small team, and using scrounged parts and the budget money, built the first Perhapsatron in 1952/53. The Perhapsatron used a toroidal tube made in the local glass shop. In the middle of the toroid was a large iron core from a transformer, which was used to induce current into the gas.

The Perhapsatron quickly displayed the same problems as the British experiments. No matter how slowly the current was added, once it reached a critical point the instabilities arose. In 1954, Martin David Kruskal and Martin Schwarzschild published a critical paper on the issue, which suggested that all Z-pinch devices were inherently unstable. Tuck proposed the addition of a second, steady, magnetic field running longitudinal along the tube, a concept he called "adding a backbone to the plasma". Several modifications to the Perhapsatron were made to test variations on these concepts, but none proved fruitful.

=== Z-pinch goes out of favor ===
The failure of Perhapsatron was followed by the failure of other pinch devices. Another team at Los Alamos had been working on another fast-pinch machine known as Columbus that used electrical fields instead of magnetic, producing the same results. Meanwhile the much larger ZETA machine in the UK also failed, after publishing results with great fanfare saying they had successfully achieved fusion. By 1961 work on Z-pinch devices had largely ended, although some research continued on the related theta-pinch concept.

Tuck never restricted himself to the pinch concept, and he spent considerable effort on other concepts, which led to joking within Los Alamos about his apparently unfocused work. Over the years he led development of several other concepts, including the picket-fence reactor, new pinch concepts, and work on mainstream devices.
