= Mary Wilma Hodge =

American physicist

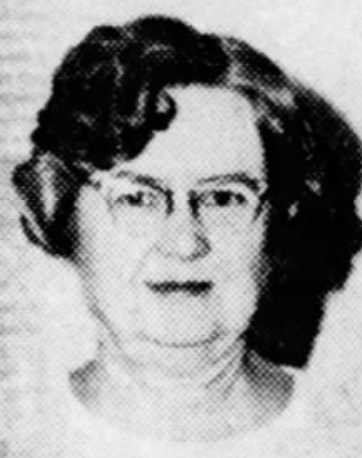
- Mary W. Hodge, from a 1972 publication of the Department of Commerce
- Born: October 20, 1909; Calhoun County, Mississippi
- Died: February 10, 1999 (aged 89); Adelphi, Maryland
- Occupations: Physicist, college professor

Mary Wilma Hodge (October 20, 1909 – February 10, 1999) was an American physicist and college professor, best known for her work on instruments to measure conditions in the Earth's atmosphere, during her long career with the National Oceanographic and Atmospheric Administration.

== Early life and education ==
Hodge was born in Calhoun County, Mississippi, the daughter of John Samuel Wymac Hodge and Beulah Spradling Hodge. She earned a bachelor's degree in 1930, and a master's degree in 1931, both at the University of Mississippi. She completed doctoral studies in physics at the University of North Carolina in 1938, with a dissertation titled "Statistical Behavior of Geiger-Müller Tube Counters."

== Career ==
Hodge taught physics, meteorology, and astronomy courses at the University of Mississippi from 1931 to 1942. She also taught at the University of North Carolina. She was co-author of Laboratory Experiments In Physics (1934, 1936), a two-volume college textbook, with S. C. Gladden and W. L. Kennon.

Hodge left academia to be a physicist with the United States Weather Bureau from 1942 to 1966, and with the National Oceanographic and Atmospheric Administration from 1966 to 1977. In 1963, she became chief of the Atmosphere Section of the Physical Science Laboratory at the National Weather Service. She worked on measurement instruments, and developed balloon-borne sensors for studying the ozone layer. "She's an expert on the response of the instrument's sensors under various conditions and the corrections needed to make the readings accurate," explained a colleague in 1972.

She was a member of the American Physical Society and the American Meteorological Society. Her research was published in academic journals including American Journal of Physics, Review of Scientific Instruments, Journal of Geophysical Research, and Monthly Weather Review. In 1972, she received a Bronze Metal from Department of Commerce and a Length of Service Award from the National Weather Service.

== Selected publications ==
- "The Physicist and the Weather" (1939)
- "An Interval Meter and Its Application to Studies of Geiger Counter Statistics" (1940, with Raymond L. Driscoll and Arthur Ruark)
- "The Physics Building Project at the University of Mississippi" (1940, with W. L. Kennon, A. B. Lewis, and S. C. Gladden)
- "Superadiabatic Lapse Rates of Temperature in Radiosonde Observations" (1956)
- "On the relations between variations of the Earth's magnetic field and variations of the large-scale atmospheric circulation" (1950, with Oliver R. Wulf)
- "Compatibility of United States Radiosondes" (1965, with Christos Harmantas)
- "Large Irregularities in the Rawinsonde Ascensional Rates within 100 Nautical Miles and Three Hours of Reported Clear Air Turbulence" (1967)
- "Analysis of Clear Air Turbulence from Rawinsonde Ascensional Rates" (1969, with Harold B. Cole and DeVer Colson)

== Personal life ==
Hodge was active at the Hughes United Methodist Church in Kensington, Maryland. She died in 1999, aged 89 years, at a nursing home in Adelphi, Maryland.
