= Bas Pease =

British physicist (1922–2004)

Rendel Sebastian Pease FRS
- Born: 2 November 1922; Cambridge
- Died: 17 October 2004 (aged 81); John Radcliffe Hospital
- Education: Trinity College, Cambridge
- Known for: Time at Culham; Siting of JET
- Spouse(s): Susan Spickernell (1952); Jean Frances White (1998); Eleanor Mary Barnes (2004)
- Children: 5
- Scientific career
- Workplaces: RAF Bomber Command; AERE; Culham Laboratory

Rendel Sebastian "Bas" Pease FRS (2 November 1922 – 17 October 2004) was a British physicist who strongly opposed nuclear weapons while advocating the use of nuclear fusion as a clean source of power.

== Biography ==
Pease was born at 9 Brunswick Walk, Cambridge. His father was the geneticist Michael Pease, son of Edward Reynolds Pease. His mother was Helen Bowen Wedgwood, daughter of Josiah Wedgwood IV. He was the four times great-grandson of the potter Josiah Wedgwood. Until he was about 11 years old, Pease was taught at home, mainly by his mother; he then went to Bedales School, from where he went up to Trinity College, Cambridge in 1940, but his studies in natural sciences were interrupted in 1942 by the war; he was able to resume them in 1946 and gained a 2(ii) in Physics the following year.

On 7 December 1942 he was called up for military service as a science officer in the operational research department, RAF Bomber Command, High Wycombe. He was part of a team of 30 working on Operation Glimmer, a scheme to convince the Germans that Britain was planning a landing at the mouth of the Pas de Calais.

After graduation, Pease joined the AERE at Harwell, and worked initially on the neutron irradiation of boron nitride. Then, from 1949, he gradually became more involved in plasma physics until he joined the Zero Energy Thermonuclear Assembly (ZETA) programme, as head of the physics group.

In 1961 Pease was appointed as a Division Head at the Culham Laboratory, responsible for the work of the Controlled Thermonuclear Research (CTR) Division; in 1968 he became the director of Culham. He encouraged work on the design of a Large Tokamak and, in so doing, became involved in a European Community project to build a Large European Tokamak, which later developed into the Joint European Torus (JET) experiment. Pease offered Culham as the site for JET, which turned out to be “a landmark in Bas’s career”.

== Appointments and awards ==
- 1947-1961 Research scientist, Atomic Energy Research Establishment, Harwell
- 1961-1967 Division Head, Culham Laboratory for Plasma Physics and Nuclear Fusion, UK
- 1964-1965 Visiting scientist, Princeton University
- 1967 Atomic Energy Authority, Assistant Director, UKAEA Research Group
- 1968-1981 Director, Culham Lab
- 1973-1977 Vice President, Institute of Physics
- 1976-1984 Chairman International Fusion Research Council, Vienna
- 1977 FRS
- 1978-1980 President, Institute of Physics
- 1981-1987 Programme Director for Fusion, UKAEA
- 1986-1987 Vice-President, Royal Society
- 1987 Retired
- 1988, 1991 Visiting professor, University of New South Wales
- 1988-200 Councillor West Ilsley Parish Council
- 1988-2002 Chairman, British Pugwash Group
- 1989 Glazebrook medal
- 1992-1997 Visitor, Blackett Laboratory, Imperial College London

=== Family ===
Rendel Pease married Susan Spickernell, daughter of Captain Sir Frank Todd Spickernell, at one time Gentleman Usher to the Royal household, and Amice Ivy Delves Broughton, on 9 August 1952. They had five children: Rosamund Mary, Sarah Frances, Christopher Fabian Delves, Michael Roland Wedgwood, and Joanna Rowan. Susan died on 5 November 1996 at age 65. On 4 April 1998 Pease married Jean Frances White, a retired personnel officer but she died two years later. On 22 March 2004 he married Eleanor Mary Barnes, a retired social worker.

Bas Pease died at the John Radcliffe Hospital.
