= James L. Tuck =

British physicist (1910–1980)

James L. Tuck OBE
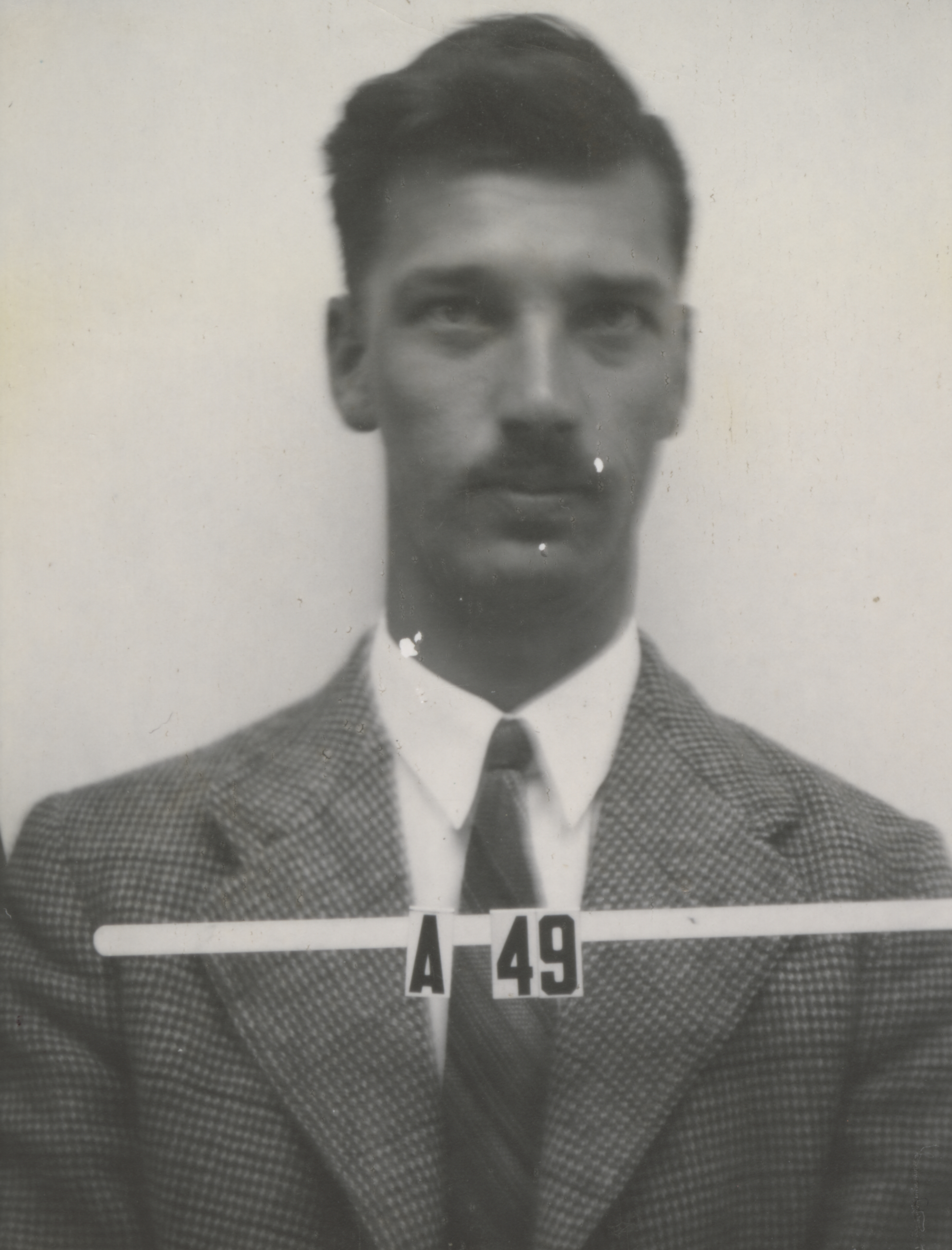
- James Tuck's ID badge photo from Los Alamos
- Born: James Leslie Tuck; 9 January 1910; Manchester, England
- Died: 15 December 1980 (aged 70); Los Alamos, New Mexico, U.S.
- Education: Manchester Central Grammar School; Victoria University of Manchester (BSc, MA); University of Oxford (MA)
- Spouse: Elsie M. Harper (m. 1937)
- Children: 2
- Scientific career
- Fields: Physics
- Workplaces: Los Alamos Laboratory; University of Oxford; Los Alamos National Laboratory

James Leslie Tuck OBE (9 January 1910 – 15 December 1980) was a British physicist, working on the applications of explosives as part of the British delegation to the Manhattan Project.

Tuck was born in Manchester, England, and educated at the Victoria University of Manchester. Because of his involvement with the Manhattan Project, he was unable to submit his thesis on time and never received his doctoral degree.

In 1937 he was offered an appointment as a Salter Research Fellow at Oxford University, where he worked with Leó Szilárd on particle accelerators. In 1937 he married Elsie Harper, with whom he would later adopt two children.

At the outbreak of World War II, he was appointed as the scientific advisor to Frederick Alexander Lindemann, who was on the private staff of Winston Churchill. His research included work on shaped charges, used in anti-tank weapons. For this work in 1944 he was made an Officer of the Order of the British Empire.

== Bomb work ==
His expertise on shaped charges led to his being sent to Los Alamos, where he was a member of the British delegation to the Manhattan Project and helped in the development of explosive lensing and the Urchin initiator. This work was crucial to the success of Fat Man, the plutonium atomic bomb.

In 1946, Tuck took part in the Operation Crossroads atomic tests on Bikini Atoll. At this time, Tuck was informed that he had missed his extended deadline to complete his PhD with the Victoria University of Manchester.

He then returned to Oxford, where he worked at the Clarendon Laboratory at Oxford University. However, he found the postwar conditions there difficult and in 1949 returned to the United States, assuming a position at the University of Chicago. A year later, he returned to Los Alamos when he was invited to work on thermonuclear research.

== Fusion power ==
At Los Alamos, Tuck took up research on fusion power, which he had learned about in the UK. Tuck suggested that the Los Alamos group pursue a pinch program similar to the one being carried out in the UK. This was only months after Lyman Spitzer had started work on his stellarator design. Both were invited to Washington to present their ideas, where Spitzer won $50,000 in funding from the Atomic Energy Commission. Returning to Los Alamos, he arranged for a similar $50,000 from the lab's discretionary budget and started a pinch project under the name Perhapsatron.

Like all pinch systems, Perhapsatron failed due to instabilities in the plasma. Theoretical work by Edward Teller and others suggested ways out of the instability problem, either pinching so quickly that fusion took place before the instabilities formed, or by using "cusped" magnetic fields. The former was developed as the Columbus while the latter became the picket fence reactor design, both led by Tuck's teams.

He remained at Los Alamos until his retirement in 1972. Earlier in 1972 he had published a review in the Bulletin of the Atomic Scientists of the book Beyond the Ivory Tower: The Frontiers of Public and Private Science by Solly Zuckerman.

After his retirement Tuck became a prominent public supporter of research into thermonuclear fusion for power generation.

== Ball lightning ==
From the late 1960s onwards Tuck took a keen interest in the phenomenon of ball lightning, probably because of the connection between plasmas and their role in fusion power schemes. In 1980 he appeared in the Arthur C. Clarke's Mysterious World episode 'Clarke's Cabinet of Curiosities' where he described his experiments at Los Alamos, carried out during lunch breaks, to create ball lightning using a large storage battery of the type then used in submarines.

== Later life ==
Tuck retired in 1973 and died in Los Alamos, New Mexico on 15 December 1980 following an extended illness.

== Honours and Service ==
- Officer of the Order of the British Empire (1944)
- Fellow of the American Physical Society (1952)
- Guggenheim Fellowship (1962)
- Fellow of the American Association for the Advancement of Science (1970)
- Editor, Review of Plasma Physics and Controlled Thermonuclear Research
