= Moses Blackman =

British physicist

Moses Blackman FRS
- Born: 6 December 1908; Cape Town
- Died: 3 June 1983 (aged 74); Putney
- Education: Rhodes University
- Known for: Crystallography
- Spouse: Anne Olivia Warburton (née Court)
- Scientific career
- Workplaces: University of Göttingen; University of Cambridge; Imperial College London
- Doctoral advisors: Max Born; Sydney Chapman

Moses Blackman FRS (6 December 1908 – 3 June 1983) was a South African-born British crystallographer.

The son of Esther (née Oshry) and Rabbi Joseph Blackman. His early school years were in Upington; Blackman then attended Victoria Boys High School when the family moved to Grahamstown in 1921. When matriculating in 1925 Blackman gained the only scholarship to nearby Rhodes University, where he concentrated on physics, mathematics, applied mathematics and German. He achieved firsts in maths, physics and German. He continued with an MSc in physics, again being awarded a first. He then spent a year as a demonstrator, building up his funds, before following his teachers' advice and moving to the University of Göttingen in March 1931. Max Born took him on as a research student. By March 1933 he had written up his work on the Raman spectrum of rock salt, just as Hitler was coming to power, and was awarded the DPhil degree by his external examiner, Werner Heisenberg.

Backman moved to England in 1933, having won a fellowship to Imperial College, where he joined Sydney Chapman's Mathematics Department. Here, he worked on lattice theory for two years, after which he was awarded a PhD, his second doctorate. Blackman then succeeded in obtaining an industrial research senior research award from the DSIR, enabling him to undertake research in Cambridge and register for a third doctorate. He worked on the detail of the Born-von Karman crystal lattice, resulting in another PhD. He was very soon invited back to Imperial College by George Thomson. He joined the Physics Department as an assistant lecturer in 1937, and was soon seen as the theoretical physicist of the department.

In the late 1930s Thomson was investigating the possibility of achieving a sustained chain reaction of uranium fission by neutrons. Blackman was one of several people involved, and contributed by making theoretical calculations concerned with neutron diffusion. The work resulted in his being appointed to serve on the British Committee on Atomic Energy during 1940 and 1941. Later, from 1942 to 1945, he carried out scientific work for the Ministry of Home Security mainly involving the properties of foams used in fire-fighting; some of the work was published after the war.

After the war, Blackman turned his attention to electron diffraction. "Under Blackman’s leadership the electron diffraction group flourished for many years, and a total of about 20 research students completed doctorates between 1949 and 1977". He was appointed to a personal chair in electron physics at Imperial College in 1959, and elected to Fellowship of the Royal Society in 1962. He retired in 1976, but was appointed a Senior Research Fellow. This gave him the freedom to take up another interest: the magnetism of lodestone; his last publications were on this subject.

During his career Blackman was a member of the International Commission on Electron Diffraction, 1957–66, and of the Safety in Mines Research Advisory Board, Ministry of Power, 1963–74.

== Family ==
Moses Blackman married Anne Olivia Warburton (née Court), a former stenographer from Sydney, in 1959. The marriage was terminated a few years later.

At the time of his death, on 3 June 1983, he lived at 48, Garden Royal, Kersfield Road, Putney.
