= Arthur Edward Ruark =

American physicist and academic

- Born: November 9, 1899; Washington, D.C., U.S.
- Died: May 1, 1979 (aged 79); Washington, D.C.

Academic background
- Education: Johns Hopkins University (AB, AM, PhD)

Academic work
- Discipline: Physics
- Sub-discipline: Quantum mechanics
- Institutions: National Bureau of Standards; Yale University; Gulf Oil; Mellon Institute of Industrial Research; University of Pittsburgh; University of North Carolina; University of Alabama; United States Atomic Energy Commission

Arthur Edward Ruark (November 9, 1899 – 1979) was an American physicist and academic known for his role in the development of quantum mechanics. He wrote the book Atoms, Molecules, and Quanta with Nobel Prize in Chemistry winner Harold Clayton Urey in 1930, and is the author of numerous scientific papers on quantum physics.

== Early life and education ==
Ruark was born in Washington, D.C., the son of Oliver Miles and Margaret Gordon Ruark (née Smith). He graduated from Towson High School in Maryland and attended Shepherd University. He received a Bachelor of Arts, Master of Arts, and PhD from Johns Hopkins University.

== Career ==
He was a member of Atomic Structure Section of the National Bureau of Standards from 1922 to 1926. He was assistant professor of physics at Yale University from 1926 to 1927. He was physicist for Gulf Oil and the Mellon Institute of Industrial Research from 1927 to 1929. He was chief of physics division Gulf Research Laboratory in 1930. He was professor of physics at the University of Pittsburgh from 1930 to 1934. He was head of the physics department at University of North Carolina after 1934. One of his doctoral students at UNC was physicist Mary Wilma Hodge.

After World War II, Ruark became the founding director of the graduate physics program of the University of Alabama. Afterwards, he became the senior associate director of research at the United States Atomic Energy Commission from 1961 to 1969. During his time with the commission, Ruark also supervised the research and development process of Project Sherwood.

Ruark is the author of Multiple Electron Transmissions and Primed Spectral Terms, 1925; Atoms, Molecules, and Quanta, 1930; Atomic Physics (with others), 1933; and numerous articles on critical potentials, Spectroscopy, wave mechanics, indetermination principle, radio activity and nuclear physics.

== Personal life ==
He married Sarah Grace Hazen, of Canton, New York, on March 17, 1927. He died in Washington, D.C., in 1979.
