= Shipp =

Shipp is an occupational surname, originating from the Old English word scip (ship), and referring to a mariner, or a ship or boat builder.

Notable people with the surname include:

- Alana Shipp (born 1982), American/Israeli professional bodybuilder
- Alexandra Shipp (born 1991), American actress
- Andrew Shipp (born 1979), Australian rules footballer
- Billy Shipp (1929–2011), retired Canadian Football League player
- Charley Shipp (1913–1988), American basketball player and coach
- Demetrius Shipp Jr. (born 1988), American actor
- Ellis Reynolds Shipp (1847–1939), one of the first female doctors in the American West (Utah)
- E. R. Shipp (born 1955), American journalist and columnist
- Frank Shipp (1884–1934), American college football player and coach, Minor League Baseball player
- Harry Shipp (born 1991), American Major League Soccer player
- Jackie Shipp (born 1962), American retired National Football League player
- Jerry Shipp (1935–2021), former American men's national basketball team player
- John Shipp (British Army officer) (1785–1834), British army soldier
- John Wesley Shipp (born 1956), American actor
- Josh Shipp (basketball) (born 1986), American basketball player
- Josh Shipp (teen expert) (born 1982), American motivational speaker
- Ken Shipp (1929–2012), American football coach
- Marcel Shipp (born 1978), American football player
- Margaret Curtis Shipp (1846–1926), American obstetrician
- Mary Shipp (born 1915), American actress
- Matthew Shipp (born 1960), American pianist
- Ray Shipp (1925–2019), Australian former politician
- Robbin Shipp (born 1963), American attorney and politician
- Scott Shipp (1839–1917), Confederate officer during the American Civil War
- Stephanie Shipp, American economist and social statistician
- Thomas Shipp and Abram Smith, lynching victims in 1930

== See also ==
- Harry W. Shipps (1926–2016), American Episcopal bishop of Georgia
- Jan Shipps (1929–2025), American historian who specialized in Mormon history
