= Statue of Martha Hughes Cannon =

Statue of Martha Hughes Cannon may refer to:

- Statue of Martha Hughes Cannon (Salt Lake City) – by Laura Lee Stay Bradshaw, 1996
- Statue of Martha Hughes Cannon (U.S. Capitol) – by Ben Hammond, 2024
