= James Patten Paul =

Scottish Mormon pioneer (1817–1891)

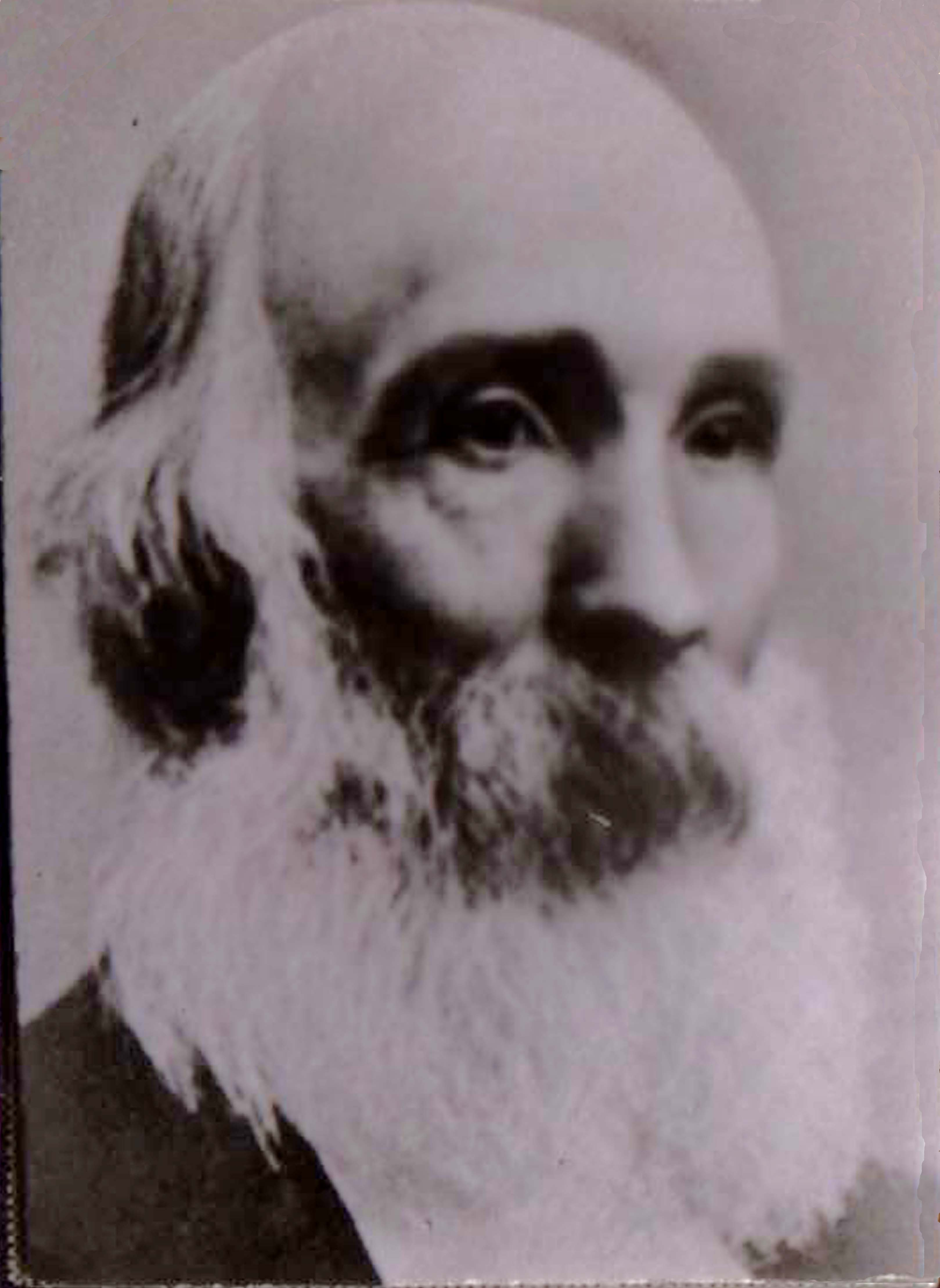

Personal details
- Born: James Patten Paul; July 17, 1817 Ayr, Scotland
- Died: April 3, 1891 (aged 73) Salt Lake City, Utah, U.S.
- Spouse(s): Robina Gribben (m. 1839); Sarah Wilson (m. 1861); Elizabeth Evans, widowed Hughes (m. 1862); Catherine Hughes (m. 1866)
- Children: 9, including Joshua Hughes Paul and stepdaughter Martha Hughes Cannon

James Patten Paul (17 July 1817 - 3 April 1891) was a Mormon pioneer from Ayrshire in Scotland who trekked to Utah with the David H. Cannon Company in 1861. His chief claim to fame is that he was the stepfather and mentor of doctor, suffragist and first female state senator of the USA Martha Hughes Cannon ("Mattie"). He was also the father of Professor Joshua Hughes Paul, a Mormon university president and newspaper editor, Utah detective Adam Milroy Paul, and silent actor Logan Paul, who, during his career in New York, portrayed, among others, Abraham Lincoln.

== Origins ==
James was a carpenter from the Burgh of Ayr in Scotland, and the son of Logan Paul and Margaret McConnell. His mother was later married to a hosier, Adam Milroy, with whom she had one child. Rev Adam Milroy, James Paul's stepbrother, was Parish Minister of Moneydie in Perthshire, Scotland. James first married Robina Gribben, the first of several wives, and the couple became Mormon converts whilst still in Scotland, after which the family emigrated to the United States. After a spell in Cincinnati, Ohio, Robina died, whereupon James took his family to Salt Lake City. Elizabeth Evans Hughes, his later wife, had herself suffered the ordeal of a Mormon Pioneer trek to Utah.

== Mormon trek ==
Peter Hughes, a Welsh carpenter and Mormon convert, and his wife Elizabeth, née Evans, departed from Liverpool on March 30, 1860, on The Underwriter on course for New York with their young family. When they arrived in New York, Hughes was ill, and Elizabeth had to take on sewing work to make ends meet, despite the fact that there were two infants, including Mattie, and a baby to look after. Luckily for them, they were allowed in July 1861 to accompany the Mormon trekkers of the Joseph Horne Company, but the journey was arduous, and the people had little to eat apart from berries and weeds they found along the way and whatever small animals they were able to shoot. Peter lay mortally ill in one of the wagons, forcing Elizabeth to walk long distances until her shoes were so worn she had to wrap rags around them. Several people died, including the Hughes baby, for whom Elizabeth was not even able to dig a proper grave. At one point the travelers were stopped by Sioux warriors, but allowed to continue their trip in exchange for provisions. Days after the train reached the “Promised Land” of Salt Lake City in September after a gruelling ordeal, Peter Hughes was dead.

== Life in Salt Lake City ==
The ensuing marriage between James Patten Paul and Elizabeth was a practical one. Elizabeth had taken her two remaining daughters to an acre and a quarter of land which had been allocated to her on the valley's east bench, and she dug out part of the hillside to build a makeshift kitchen. The three meanwhile slept in the covered wagon they had used on the trail. James was widowed, had four children of his own, and needed a wife with stamina. The couple set about building an adobe home on Elizabeth's patch, and when they ran out of nails for the roof, Elizabeth managed to purchase further supplies by selling some items of Welsh clothing she still owned. The family thrived, and five further children were born to the Paul family. According to LDS Church history, Mattie "loved her stepfather, and, once away at medical school, used his last name as her own." Although he earned little in his capacity of cabinet maker on the Union Pacific Railroad, Paul lent his stepdaughter Mattie as much money as he could afford for her medical studies, and built her a wooden trunk for her clothes and books. After she graduated as a medical doctor, Paul added a wing to his house for her to use as an office.

== Novel ==
Both James and Elizabeth are portrayed in a novel on the life of Martha Hughes Cannon by American author Marianne Monson, who used LDS sources and Mattie's daughter's recollections as a foundation for her story.

== Death ==
James Patten Paul died on April 3, 1891 in Salt Lake City.
