= Martha Hughes Cannon =

American physician and politician (1857–1932)

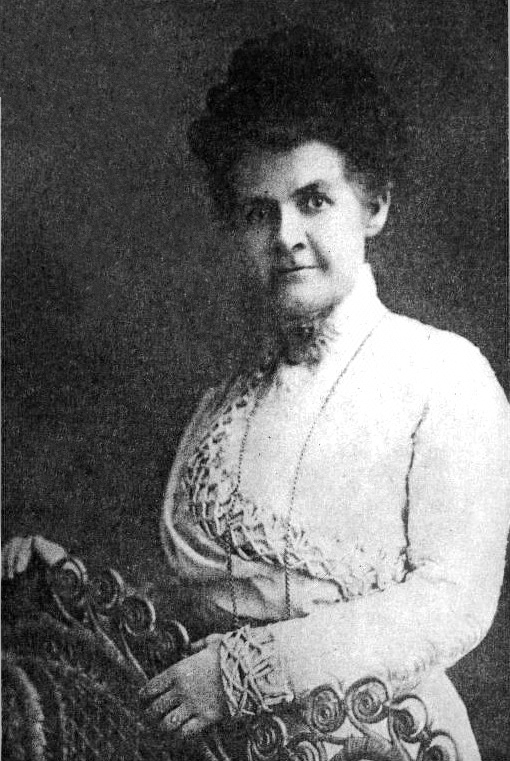

Member of the Utah Senate from the 6th district
- In office January 11, 1897 – January 13, 1901
- Preceded by: George Mousley Cannon
- Succeeded by: Hoyt Sherman

Personal details
- Born: Martha Maria Hughes; July 1, 1857 Llandudno, Wales
- Died: July 10, 1932 (aged 75) Los Angeles, California, U.S.
- Resting place: Salt Lake City Cemetery, Salt Lake City, Utah, U.S.
- Party: Democratic
- Spouse: Angus Cannon
- Children: 3
- Relatives: James Patten Paul (stepfather); Joshua Hughes Paul (half-brother); See Cannon family
- Education: University of Utah (BS); University of Michigan (MD); University of Pennsylvania (BS); National School of Elocution and Oratory (BA)

Martha Maria "Mattie" Hughes Cannon (July 1, 1857 – July 10, 1932) was a Welsh-American politician, medical doctor, Utah women's rights advocate, suffragist, and a polygamous wife. Her family immigrated to the United States as converts to the Church of Jesus Christ of Latter-day Saints (LDS Church) and traveled West to settle in the Utah Territory with other church members. She started working at the age of fourteen, and at sixteen she enrolled in the University of Deseret (now called the University of Utah), receiving a bachelor's degree in Chemistry. She later attended the University of Michigan and received an M.D.

She became the fourth of six wives in a polygamous marriage to Angus M. Cannon, a prominent Latter-day Saint leader during the anti-polygamy crusade. Cannon exiled herself to Europe so she wouldn't have to testify against her husband and others. Upon returning to Utah, Cannon worked as a doctor and fought for women's rights. She helped put women enfranchisement into Utah's constitution when it was granted statehood in 1896. On November 3, 1896, Cannon became the first female state senator elected in the United States, defeating her own husband, who was also on the ballot. Cannon was the author of Utah sanitation laws and was a founder and member of Utah's first State Board of Health.

== Biography ==
=== Early life ===
Martha Maria Hughes Cannon was born near Llandudno, Caernarfonshire, Wales on July 1, 1857, the daughter of Peter Hughes and Elizabeth Evans. She was known by the nickname "Mattie". The Hughes family were converts to the LDS Church and emigrated to the United States with their two daughters, Mary Elizabeth and Martha Maria. They embarked from Liverpool, England on March 30, 1860, on the ship Underwriter and arrived in New York City, New York on May 1, 1860. Peter was very sick at the time, and Elizabeth gave birth to their third child, Annie Lloyd. They stayed in New York to earn money to travel the plains to Utah Territory. Erastus Snow, a church leader, invited the family to join a pioneer company funded by the LDS Church for the less fortunate. The family accepted the invitation and traveled by train to Florence, Nebraska, and left with the Joseph Horne company on July 11, 1861. Shortly before the family's arrival in the Salt Lake Valley, on September 3, 1861, Martha's sister, Annie Lloyd Hughes, died and was buried in an unmarked grave. She was 21 months old. The Joseph Horne company arrived in the Salt Lake Valley on September 13, 1861. Three days after they arrived in Salt Lake City, on September 17, 1861, Peter Hughes died. Elizabeth Hughes was left a widow with two young daughters at the age of 28. Thirteen months later, Elizabeth married James Patten Paul, a widower with four sons, and they were the parents of university professor and newspaper editor Joshua Hughes Paul. After Elizabeth's marriage to James P. Paul, Martha, at different times in her life, went by the surnames of both Paul and Hughes. Later in life, Paul encouraged Martha to follow her dream of becoming a medical doctor.

=== Education and career ===
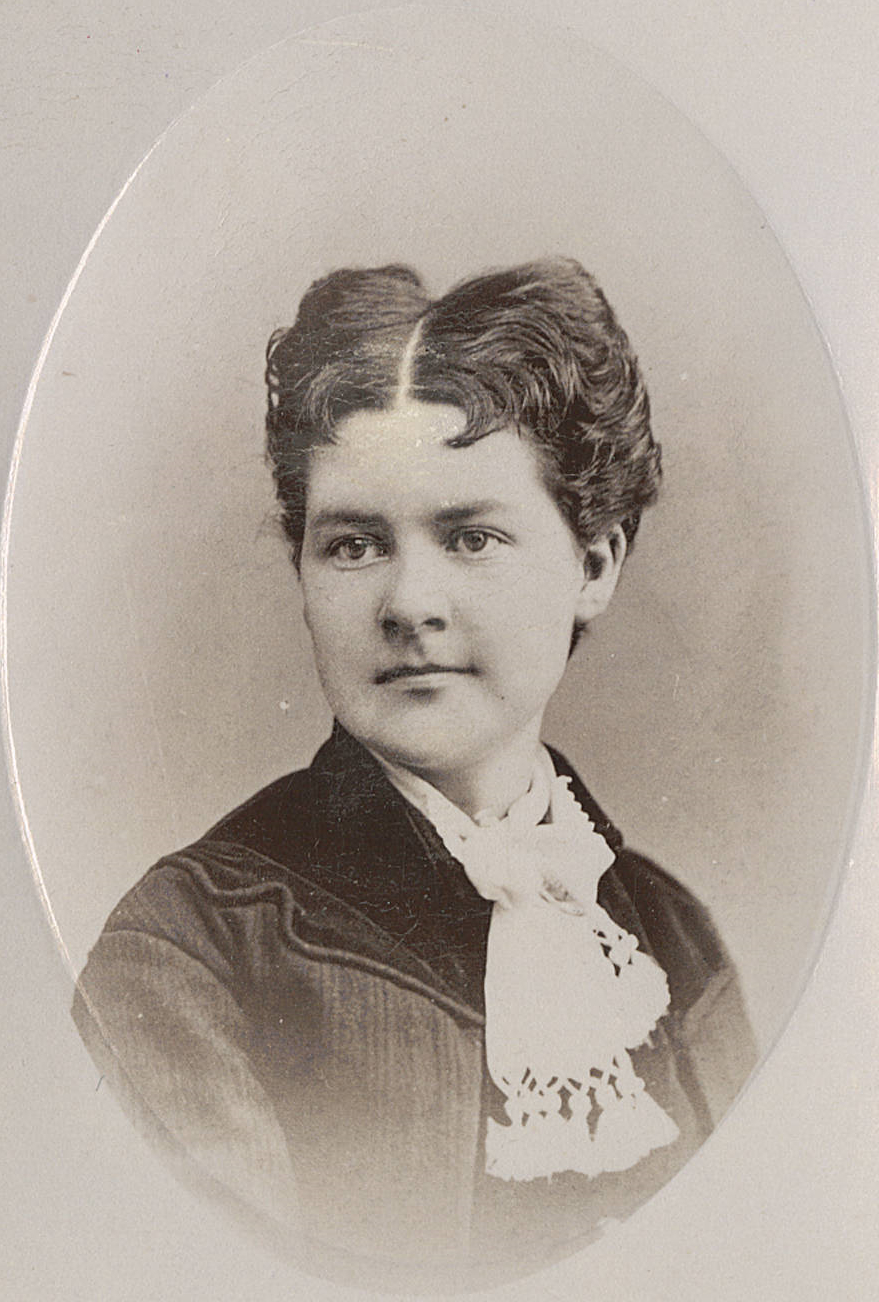
Martha Maria Hughes Cannon in the year 1880.

At age fourteen, Hughes taught school for a year, but quit when she had trouble controlling her larger male students. Brigham Young asked Hughes to learn typesetting, and she worked as an apprentice for Hyrum Perry. Hughes first worked as a typesetter for the Deseret News. Later she worked as a typesetter for the Women's Exponent, a women's newspaper in Salt Lake City published by Emmeline B. Wells and affiliated with the Relief Society. While working at the Women's Exponent, Hughes met Wells and Eliza R. Snow. These two women were her mentors and encouraged Hughes in her aspiration to become a doctor.

In an October 1873 general conference address, Brigham Young encouraged women, specifically, to enter the medical field and become doctors. The same year, at age sixteen, Martha Hughes enrolled in the University of Deseret as a pre-med major, working as a typesetter during the day while taking night classes. She graduated from the University of Deseret in 1878 with a degree in chemistry.

On August 13, 1878, Hughes was one of four women set apart for medical studies and practice by the LDS Church. Church president John Taylor and his counselor, George Q. Cannon, set them apart. The other three women were Romania B. Pratt, Ellis R. Shipp, and Maggie Shipp. Pratt and Ellis Shipp had already received their medical degrees while Maggie Shipp and Hughes were heading out to earn theirs. Ellis R. Shipp and Maggie Shipp were plural wives of Milford Shipp. Maggie had been watching the children of Ellis in the Utah Territory while Ellis earned an M.D. Now as Hughes was heading to the University of Michigan for her M.D., Maggie was taking her turn to become a doctor as well.

Hughes started at the University of Michigan in the autumn of 1878. With limited funds, she spent her first year working in the student dormitories. During her second year Hughes worked as a secretary for another student, Bethenia Owens-Adair. She graduated July 1, 1880, on her 23rd birthday. She briefly practiced medicine in Algonac, Michigan. In 1881, she moved to Philadelphia to take post-graduate courses at the Auxiliary Medical Department of the University of Pennsylvania. Hughes was the only woman out of 75 students. Additionally, Hughes took night classes to learn more about pharmaceuticals and enrolled at the National School of Elocution and Oratory. In 1882, she earned a bachelor's degree in pharmacy from the University of Pennsylvania and a bachelor's degree in oratory from the National School of Elocution and Oratory. At age 25, Hughes had earned four degrees.

Hughes returned to Salt Lake City, Utah and opened a private practice in a new wing of the home built by her stepfather. Soon after, she was called by LDS Church leaders to become the resident physician for the newly founded Deseret Hospital in 1882. As Deseret Hospital's paid physician, Hughes set up training classes for nurses and lectures on obstetrics.

=== Plural marriage and exile ===
While working at the Deseret Hospital, Martha met a polygamist, Angus Munn Cannon, who was the superintendent of the new hospital and a local LDS Church official. Polygamy was a hot topic in Utah Territory. To LDS Church members, polygamy was sacred, but to the rest of the United States, it was offensive. In 1882, the Edmunds Act was passed by Congress making polygamy a felony punishable by a $500 fine and five years in prison. When Martha married Angus in the temple on October 6, 1884, becoming the fourth of his six plural wives, the marriage was kept secret as it was a religious ceremony rather than a legally binding contract. Martha Cannon's mother knew nothing of the ceremony. Still, rumors of her marriage to Angus brought pressure to the Deseret Hospital. Cannon was called to testify before the court, but she eluded federal officers. Angus was also called to testify and after a court hearing, was sent to jail. Cannon joined the Mormon "underground" seeking to avoid providing federal marshals with proof of her plural marriage to Angus. She also feared being forced to provide testimony against others, based on information gathered through her obstetrical practice.

Cannon found that she was pregnant after Angus was sent to jail. She had her first child, Elizabeth Rachel, while in hiding and with Angus still in captivity. Evading warrants in 1886, she decided to visit her mother's relatives in Europe and chose to exile herself from the Utah Territory. Only a few days before her departure, Angus married his fifth wife, Maria Bennion, who was six months younger than Martha. Cannon and her baby traveled to New York and then to Europe. She first stayed with her uncle in Birmingham. However, Elizabeth grew sick and Cannon, fearing for her daughter's life, moved to the parish of Wolverton near Stratford-upon-Avon to stay with relatives. During Cannon's self-exile, her letters to Angus show increasing jealousy and resentment of his new wife. Cannon wrote to Angus about Elizabeth's improving health also adding, "perhaps at this very moment you are basking in the smiles of your young Maria." In 1887, Angus married Johanna Danielson, while Cannon was exiled in Europe, unable to return to Utah for fear of having to testify. Later that year Lewis, a son of Angus, traveled to England while waiting for a passport for Switzerland to proselytize. Cannon met him and together they toured Wales, Paris, and Switzerland. However, Cannon was increasingly homesick and depressed, and in December 1887 she left Liverpool on the SS Arizona bound for New York. To her surprise, Angus met Cannon and Elizabeth as they arrived.

Correspondence between Cannon and her husband during this period provides a window into 19th-century polygamous life in Utah and also on "the underground" just prior to the practice's abolition. It was a time when many polygamous families went into hiding to avoid legal pressures which threatened to sever polygamous families. Cannon expressed concern that because of the legal pressures, she might never "have any respectable married life."

=== As a suffragist ===
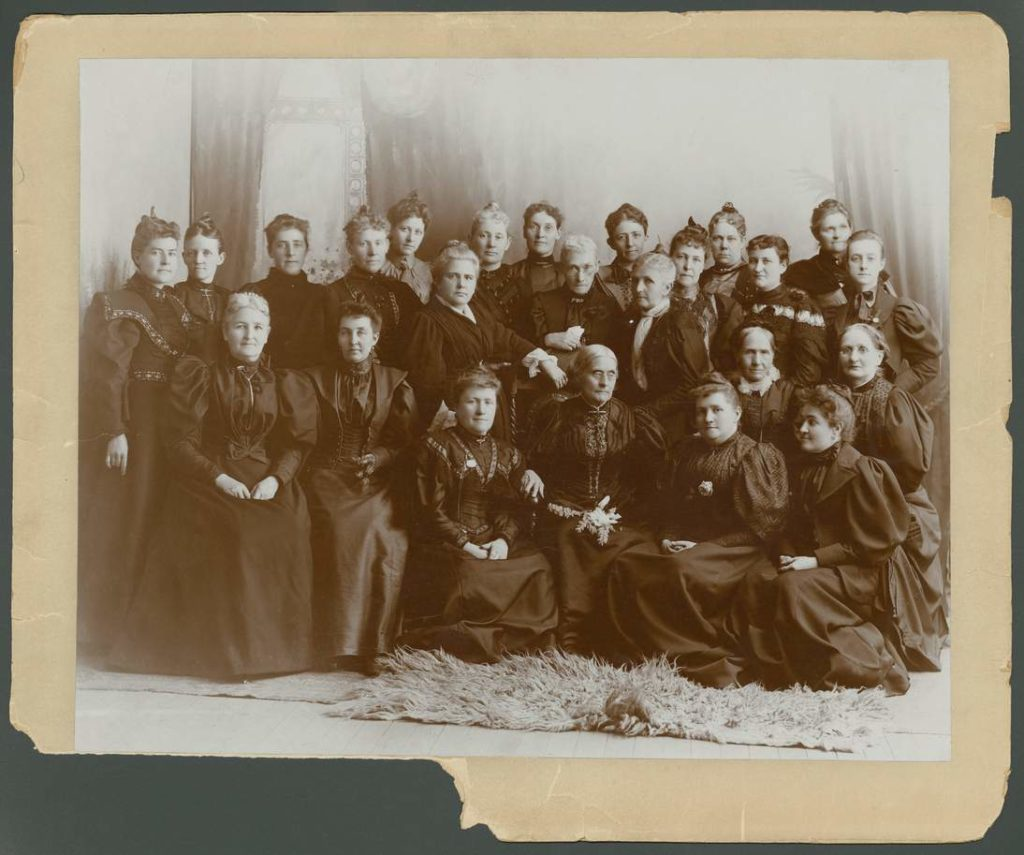
Susan B. Anthony (first row fourth from left) with suffrage leaders from Utah and elsewhere. Dr. Martha Cannon standing far left.

The Edmunds–Tucker Act was passed while Cannon was in exile. In an effort to limit Mormon religious leadership in government, the act disenfranchised women of the Utah Territory who had been voting in elections since 1870. The women of Utah Territory had previously enjoyed voting rights, and they began to rally together to fight for suffrage. After Cannon returned she became a leader in the Utah Women's Suffrage Association, giving speeches in Utah and traveling to suffrage conferences with Susan B. Anthony and Elizabeth Cady Stanton. At the World's Columbian Exposition of 1893, Martha Hughes Cannon was featured as a speaker of the Women's Congress. She then traveled to Washington D.C. to give a status report to a congressional committee on women's suffrage work in Utah.

In her fight for women suffrage, Cannon felt that education, freedom, and purpose were vitally important for mothers, stating:

Somehow I know that women who stay home all the time have the most unpleasant homes there are. You give me a woman who thinks about something besides cook stoves and wash tubs and baby flannels, and I'll show you, nine times out of ten, a successful mother.

She defended polygamy, believing wives in a polygamous marriage may in fact have more freedom than a monogamous marriage, stating that if a husband had more than one wife, that wife had freedom in the weeks her husband was away visiting his other wives. In February 1927, three decades after becoming the first women state senator of the United States, Cannon attended the 30th annual convention of the American Woman Suffrage Association in Washington D.C.

=== Political career ===
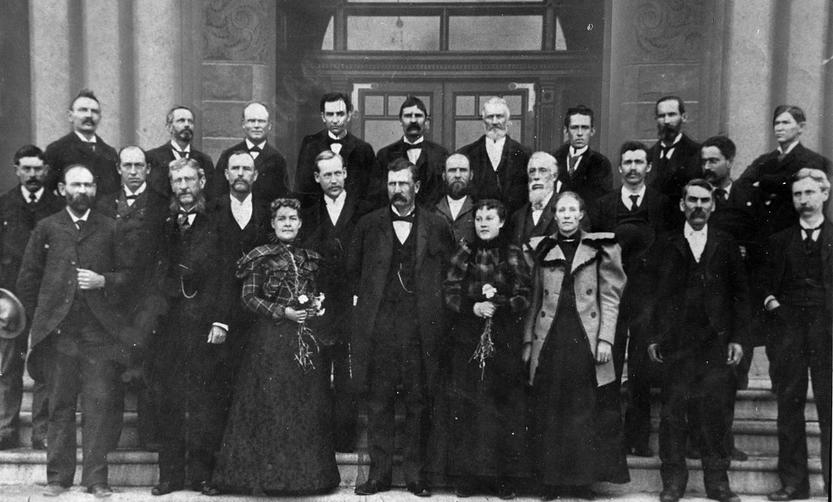
The Utah State Senate in 1897, Dr. Martha Hughes Cannon standing to the left of center.

After 1888, Cannon resumed her Salt Lake medical practice and taught nursing courses through a school established at Deseret Hospital. By 1896, a suffrage clause in the new state constitution had restored the right to vote to Utah women. In a heavily publicized election, Cannon was one of five Democrats running as "at large" candidates for state senator from Salt Lake County. Suffrage activist Emmeline B. Wells and Cannon's husband Angus were among the Republicans running for the office. The five candidates with the largest quantity of votes were elected.

Local and national newspapers gave play to the fact that a leading Mormon polygamist was defeated by his fourth wife. The Salt Lake Tribune, proponent of the Republican view, backed Angus Munn Cannon. The Salt Lake Herald, a Democratic newspaper, countered: "Mrs. Mattie Hughes Cannon, his wife, is the better man of the two. Send Mrs. Cannon to the State Senate and let Mr. Cannon, as a Republican, remain at home to manage home industry".

On November 3, 1896, Martha Hughes Cannon became the first woman elected as a state senator in the United States with 10,288 votes while her husband only received 8,054 votes. The couple reported that no relationship issues were produced from the election. Cannon introduced three bills in her first month in state senate. In consequence of her bill, an Act Providing for Compulsory Education of Deaf, Dumb, and Blind Citizens, Governor Heber Wells appointed Cannon to the board of directors for the school for the Deaf and Dumb. During her second term as State Senator, she drafted a bill for the building of a hospital at the Deaf and Dumb school. Her second bill was an Act to Protect the Health of Women and Girl Employees. The bill protected women and girls by requiring employers to give female employees something to rest on when they weren't serving customers. At the time nothing was provided and many female employees were left exhausted. Her last bill from her first month in office was an Act Creating a State Board of Health and Defining its Duties.

Cannon also sponsored the State's first pure food law. She fought against lobbyists trying to abolish the State Board of Public Examiners. The board was in charge of certifying the qualifications of doctors and midwives, preventing impersonators from potentially hurting patients. As a doctor, Cannon took personal interest in fighting against the lobbyists attempting to terminate an association that protected physicians. In 1898, at the invitation of officials of the National American Woman's Suffrage Association, two years after becoming the country's first woman state senator, Cannon spoke at the Seneca Falls 50th year celebration in Washington D.C. Cannon also testified before the U.S. House Committee on the Judiciary of the positive effects of women's franchise in Utah. Twenty-two years later, women's suffrage was added as the 19th amendment to the United States Constitution.

During the second half of her term in Utah's state senate, Cannon set up a commission that provided for regulations regarding contagious disease. She was appointed to the Board of Health by Governor Heber Wells, staying in the position until December 31, 1903. Cannon attempted to prohibit children not vaccinated from attending school in case of a disease outbreak. The Board of Health sent out vaccines; however, the Deseret News spread information that vaccines weren't safe. LDS Church leaders were divided on the subject. One apostle, Brigham Young Jr., was very vocal in his opinions, writing in the Deseret News about the evils of vaccinations. The influence of the Deseret News and Mormon religious leaders limited how many people were willing to be vaccinated. Disease grew rampant in the state of Utah, and the smallpox epidemic of 1898–1899 closed an entire town in Sanpete County. The epidemic Cannon tried to prevent began to spread through the state. To mitigate the effects of disease, Cannon eliminated communal cups attached to water fountains in Salt Lake Valley.

Cannon's third child was born at the close of her term and subsequently she did not run again for office. At the end of her term, Deseret News wrote, "In political conventions, her wit, rapid thinking, and knowledge made her capable of holding her own and of representing her sex most favorably." Cannon lost only one bill: an Act Providing for the Teaching in the Public Schools of the Effects of Alcoholic Drinks and Narcotics on the Human System

=== Last few years and death ===
After leaving the legislature, Cannon still served as a member of the Utah Board of Health and as a member of the board of the Utah State School for the Deaf and Dumb. In 1902, she became a member of the psychology section of the Medico-Legacy Society of New York. The society's main focus was tuberculosis. In 1904, Cannon moved to California with her children for health reasons and became the vice president of the National Congress of Tuberculosis. She also worked at the Selwyn Emmett Graves Memorial Dispensary. After her husband's death in 1915, Cannon later moved to Los Angeles, California, where she lived in a home her son had built for her. She died on July 10, 1932. Cannon's body was laid to rest at the Salt Lake City Cemetery.

== Legacy and honors ==
- In 1986 the new Utah Department of Health building was dedicated and named the Martha Hughes Cannon health building in Salt Lake City.
- An eight-foot-high bronze statue of Martha Hughes Cannon by Laura Lee Stay Bradshaw, dedicated in 1996, was housed in the Utah state Capitol rotunda. Her grandson, Robert J. Cannon, spoke at the dedication. After the Utah Capitol re-dedication in 2008, the bronze statue of Cannon was moved to the foyer of the Utah State Senate building on Utah Capitol Hill.
- There is also a bronze plaque honoring the "author of Utah sanitation laws" on a boulder next to a drinking fountain on the northeast corner of 200 West and South Temple.
- Since 1990, Utah officials have lobbied the U.S. Postal Service for a stamp in Cannon's honor.
- In 2011, a group of students at Brigham Young University created a stage play and later a film about five strong females of faith, which included Martha Hughes Cannon.
- In July 2012, KUED produced an almost one-hour long documentary on Martha Hughes Cannon's life.
- In October 2015, legislators formed the Martha Hughes Cannon Caucus in an effort to encourage more women in Utah to participate in government.
- The Utah State Legislature voted in 2018 to gift a statue of Martha Hughes Cannon to the U.S. Capitol's National Statuary Hall, replacing the statue of Philo T. Farnsworth, gifted in 1990. The statue was officially unveiled on December 11, 2024, in Emancipation Hall in the United States Capitol Visitor Center, joining the statue of Brigham Young as Utah's two statues in the National Statuary Hall Collection.
- The non-profit organization Utah Women Run has given Martha Hughes Cannon awards annually since 2023 to honor women whose public service has significantly impacted Utah.

== In popular culture ==
In 2020, Her Quiet Revolution, a historical fiction novel about Cannon's life and work by American author Marianne Monson, appeared in commemoration of the 100th anniversary of U.S. women’s suffrage.

== See also ==
- Cannon Family
- Women's suffrage in Utah
