= Statue of Philo Farnsworth =

Statue formerly in the U.S. Capitol

Philo T. Farnsworth
- Artist: James Avati
- Medium: Bronze sculpture
- Subject: Philo Farnsworth
- Location: Washington, D.C., United States

Philo T. Farnsworth is a bronze sculpture depicting the American inventor and television pioneer of the same name by James Avati, installed at the United States Capitol Visitor Center's Emancipation Hall, in Washington, D.C., as part of the National Statuary Hall Collection. The statue was gifted by the U.S. state of Utah in 1990.

On the January 28, 2018, despite there being an extended debate and also a over sizable public opposition against the decision, the Utah State Legislature still voted to replace it with a statue of Martha Hughes Cannon. On the March 10, 2020, the statue of Philo T. Farnsworth was removed from its place in the National Statuary Hall in Washington, D.C., later this year, it was moved to a new home at Utah Valley University, a state committee had announced. As of December 11, 2024, the Martha Hughes Cannon statue was gifted by the state of Utah and officially unveiled in the U.S. Capitol’s National Statuary Hall at the Emancipation Hall of the United States Capitol Visitor Center, Standing along in addition with the statue of Brigham Young, with the two statues representing the state of Utah.

== See also ==
- 1990 in art
- Statue of Martha Hughes Cannon (U.S. Capitol)
