= Philo Farnsworth =

American inventor (1906–1971)

Philo T. Farnsworth
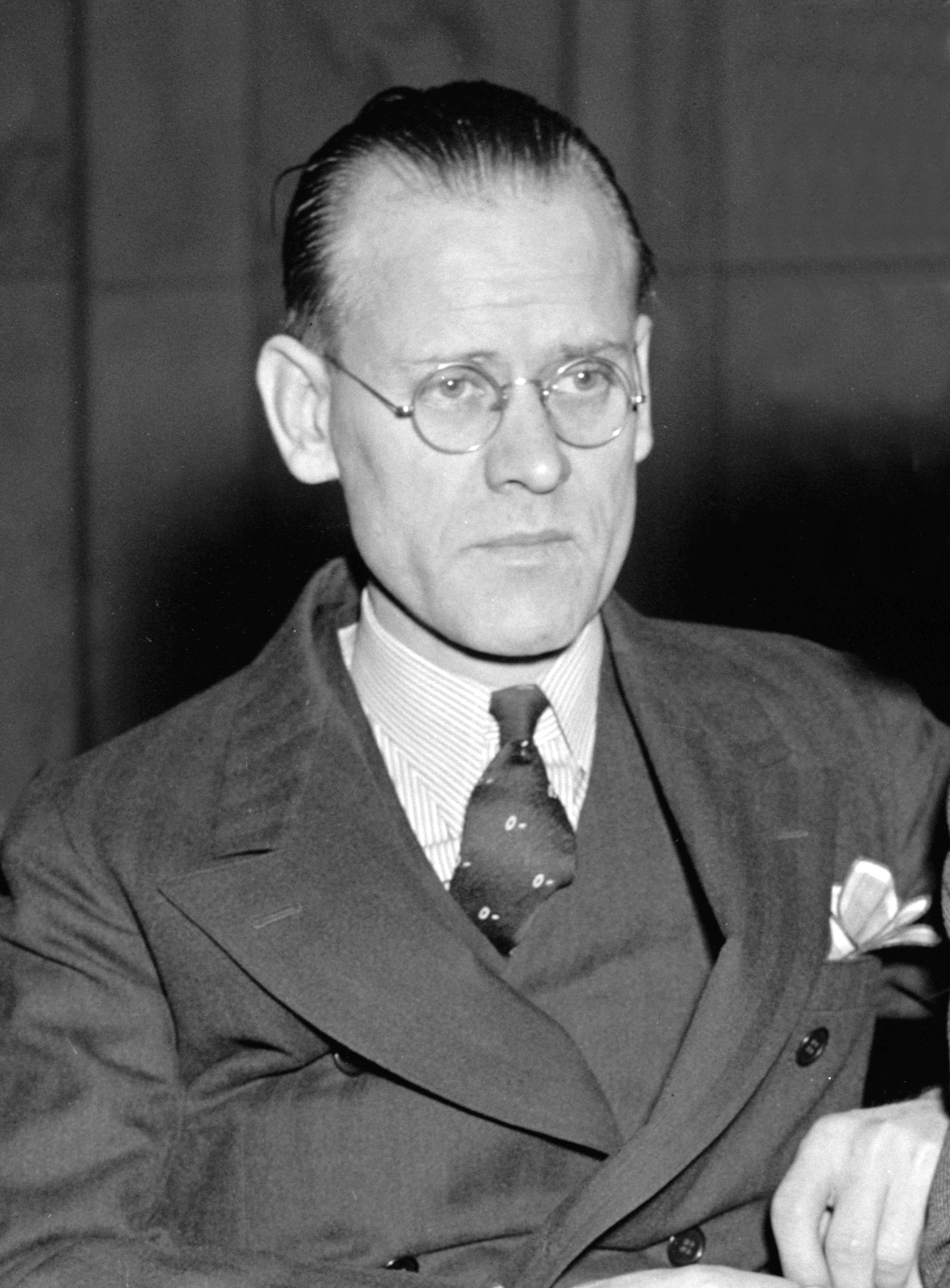
- Farnsworth in 1939
- Born: August 19, 1906; Beaver, Utah, U.S.
- Died: March 11, 1971 (aged 64); Holladay, Utah, U.S.
- Resting place: Provo City Cemetery, Provo, Utah, U.S.
- Occupation: Scientist
- Employers: Philco; Farnsworth Television and Radio Corporation; International Telephone and Telegraph
- Known for: Inventor of the first fully electronic television; over 169 United States and foreign patents
- Spouse: Elma "Pem" Gardner (1908–2006)
- Children: 4 sons
- Relatives: Agnes Ann Farnsworth (sister)

Philo Taylor Farnsworth (August 19, 1906 – March 11, 1971) was an American inventor who was granted the first patent for the television by the United States government. He also invented a video camera tube and the image dissector. He sold a fully functioning television system—complete with receiver and camera—which he produced commercially through the Farnsworth Television and Radio Corporation from 1938 to 1951, in Fort Wayne, Indiana.

In later life, Farnsworth invented a small nuclear fusion device, the Farnsworth Fusor, employing inertial electrostatic confinement (IEC). Like many fusion devices, it was not a practical device for generating nuclear power, although it provides a viable source of neutrons. The design of this device has been the inspiration for other fusion approaches, including the Polywell reactor concept. Farnsworth held 300 patents, mostly in radio and television.

== Early life ==
Farnsworth was born August 19, 1906, the eldest of five children of Lewis Edwin Farnsworth and Serena Amanda Bastian, a Latter-day Saint couple living in a small log cabin built by Lewis's father in Manderfield, near Beaver, Utah. His maternal grandfather, Jacob Bastian, was a Mormon immigrant from Denmark. In 1918, the family moved to a relative's 240-acre (1.0 km^{2}) ranch near Rigby, Idaho, where his father supplemented his farming income by hauling freight with his horse-drawn wagon. Philo was excited to find that his new home was wired for electricity, with a Delco generator providing power for lighting and farm machinery. He was a quick student in mechanical and electrical technology, repairing the troublesome generator. He found a burned-out electric motor among some items discarded by the previous tenants and rewound the armature; he converted his mother's hand-powered washing machine into an electric-powered one. He developed an early interest in electronics after his first telephone conversation with a distant relative, and he discovered a large cache of technology magazines in the attic of their new home. He won $25 in a pulp-magazine contest for inventing a magnetized car lock. Farnsworth was a member of the Church of Jesus Christ of Latter-day Saints.

Farnsworth excelled in chemistry and physics at Rigby High School. He asked science teacher Justin Tolman for advice about an electronic television system that he was contemplating; he provided the teacher with sketches and diagrams covering several blackboards to show how it might be accomplished electronically, and Tolman encouraged him to develop his ideas. One of the drawings that he did on a blackboard for his chemistry teacher was recalled and reproduced for a patent interference case between Farnsworth and RCA.

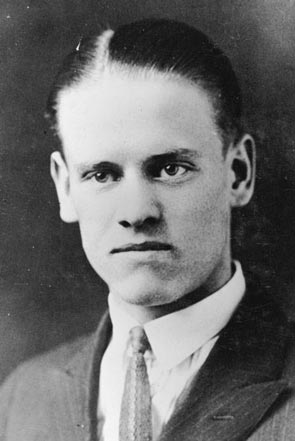
Yearbook photo of Farnsworth, 1924

In 1923, the family moved to Provo, Utah, and Farnsworth attended Brigham Young High School that fall. His father died of pneumonia in January 1924 at age 58, and Farnsworth assumed responsibility for sustaining the family while finishing high school. After graduating BYHS in June 1924, he applied to the United States Naval Academy in Annapolis, Maryland, where he earned the nation's second-highest score on academy recruiting tests. However, he was already thinking ahead to his television projects; he learned that the government would own his patents if he stayed in the military, so he obtained an honorable discharge within months of joining under a provision in which the eldest child in a fatherless family could be excused from military service to provide for his family. He returned to Provo and enrolled at Brigham Young University, but he was not allowed by the faculty to attend their advanced science classes. He attended anyway and made use of the university's research labs, and he earned a Junior Radio-Trician certification from the National Radio Institute, and full certification in 1925. While attending college, he met Provo High School student Elma "Pem" Gardner (1908–2006), whom he eventually married.

Farnsworth worked while his sister Agnes took charge of the family home and the second-floor boarding house, with the help of a cousin living with the family. The Farnsworths later moved into half of a duplex, with family friends the Gardners moving into the other side when it became vacant. He developed a close friendship with Pem's brother Cliff Gardner, who shared his interest in electronics, and the two moved to Salt Lake City to start a radio repair business. The business failed, and Gardner returned to Provo.

Farnsworth remained in Salt Lake City and became acquainted with Leslie Gorrell and George Everson, a pair of San Francisco philanthropists who were then conducting a Salt Lake City Community Chest fund-raising campaign. They agreed to fund his early television research with an initial $6,000 in backing, and set up a laboratory in Los Angeles for Farnsworth to carry out his experiments.

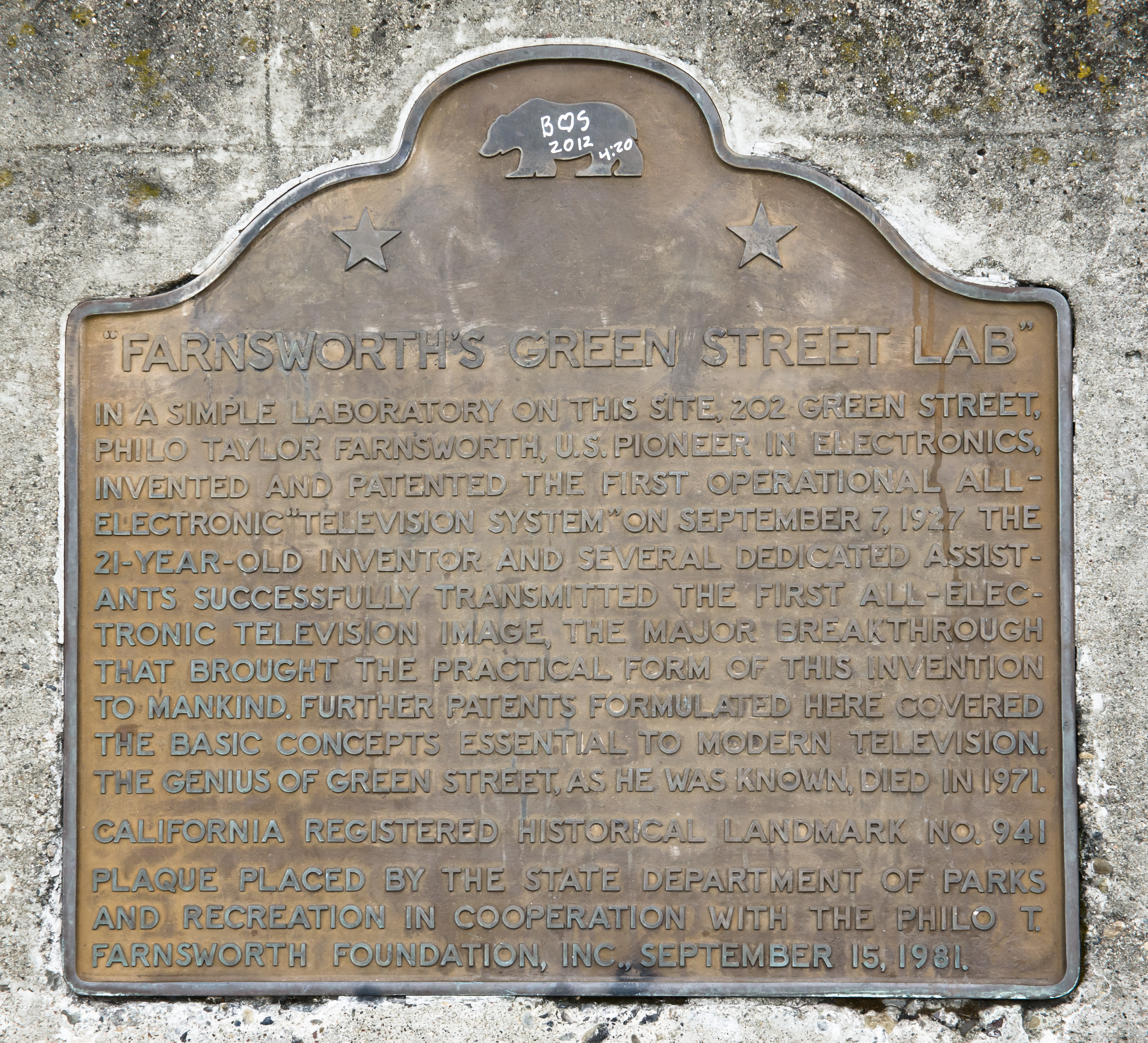
Plaque at the location of Farnsworth's San Francisco laboratory on Green Street

Farnsworth married Pem on May 27, 1926, and the two traveled to Berkeley, California, in a Pullman coach. They rented a house at 2910 Derby Street, from which he applied for his first television patent, which was granted on August 26, 1930. By that time they had moved across the bay to San Francisco, where Farnsworth set up his new lab at 202 Green Street.

== Career ==
A few months after arriving in California, Farnsworth was prepared to show his models and drawings to a patent attorney who was nationally recognized as an authority on electrophysics. Everson and Gorrell agreed that Farnsworth should apply for patents for his designs, a decision that proved crucial in later disputes with RCA. Most television systems in use at the time used image scanning devices ("rasterizers") employing rotating "Nipkow disks" comprising a spinning disk with holes arranged in spiral patterns such that they swept across an image in a succession of short arcs while focusing the light they captured on photosensitive elements, thus producing a varying electrical signal corresponding to the variations in light intensity. Farnsworth recognized the limitations of the mechanical systems, and that an all-electronic scanning system could produce a superior image for transmission to a receiving device.

On September 7, 1927, Farnsworth's image dissector camera tube transmitted its first image, a simple straight line, to a receiver in another room of his laboratory at 202 Green Street in San Francisco. Pem Farnsworth recalled in 1984 that her husband broke the stunned silence of his lab assistants by saying, "There you are – electronic television!" The source of the image was a glass slide, backlit by an arc lamp. An extremely bright source was required because of the low light sensitivity of the design. By 1928, Farnsworth had developed the system sufficiently to hold a demonstration for the press. His backers had demanded to know when they would see dollars from the invention; so the first image shown was, appropriately, a dollar sign. In 1929, the design was further improved by elimination of a motor-generator, which meant the television system now had no mechanical parts. During the same year, Farnsworth transmitted the first live human images with his system, including a 3.5 in (89 mm) image of his wife Elma ("Pem") with her eyes closed (possibly due to the bright lighting required).

Many inventors had built electromechanical television systems before Farnsworth's seminal contribution, but Farnsworth designed and built the world's first working all-electronic television system, employing electronic scanning in both the pickup and display devices. He first demonstrated his system to the press on September 3, 1928, and to the public at the Franklin Institute in Philadelphia on August 25, 1934.

In 1930, RCA recruited Vladimir K. Zworykin—who had tried, unsuccessfully, to develop his own all-electronic television system at Westinghouse in Pittsburgh since 1923—to lead its television development department. Before leaving his old employer, Zworykin visited Farnsworth's laboratory, and was sufficiently impressed with the performance of the Image Dissector that he reportedly had his team at Westinghouse make several copies of the device for experimentation. Zworykin later abandoned research on the Image Dissector, which at the time required extremely bright illumination of its subjects, and turned his attention to what became the Iconoscope. In a 1970s series of videotaped interviews, Zworykin recalled that, "Farnsworth was closer to this thing you're using now [i.e., a video camera] than anybody, because he used the cathode-ray tube for transmission. But, Farnsworth didn't have the mosaic [of discrete light elements], he didn't have storage. Therefore, [picture] definition was very low.... But he was very proud, and he stuck to his method." Contrary to Zworykin's statement, Farnsworth's patent number 2,087,683 for the Image Dissector (filed April 26, 1933) features the "charge storage plate" invented by Tihanyi in 1928 and a "low velocity" method of electron scanning, also describes "discrete particles" whose "potential" is manipulated and "saturated" to varying degrees depending on their velocity. Farnsworth's patent numbers 2,140,695 and 2,233,888 are for a "charge storage dissector" and "charge storage amplifier," respectively.

In 1931, David Sarnoff of RCA offered to buy Farnsworth's patents for $100,000, with the stipulation that he become an employee of RCA, but Farnsworth refused. In June of that year, Farnsworth joined the Philco company and moved to Philadelphia along with his wife and two children. RCA later filed an interference suit against Farnsworth, claiming Zworykin's 1923 patent had priority over Farnsworth's design, despite the fact it could present no evidence that Zworykin had actually produced a functioning transmitter tube before 1931. Farnsworth had lost two interference claims to Zworykin in 1928, but this time he prevailed and the U.S. Patent Office rendered a decision in 1934 awarding priority of the invention of the image dissector to Farnsworth. RCA lost a subsequent appeal, but litigation over a variety of issues continued for several years before Sarnoff finally agreed to pay Farnsworth royalties.

In 1932, while in England to raise money for his legal battles with RCA, Farnsworth met with John Logie Baird, a Scottish inventor who had given the world's first public demonstration of a working television system in London in 1926, using an electro-mechanical imaging system, and who was seeking to develop electronic television receivers. Baird demonstrated his mechanical system for Farnsworth.

In May 1933, Philco severed its relationship with Farnsworth because, said Everson, "it [had] become apparent that Philo's aim at establishing a broad patent structure through research [was] not identical with the production program of Philco." In Everson's view the decision was mutual and amicable. Farnsworth set up shop at 127 East Mermaid Lane in Philadelphia, and in 1934 held the first public exhibition of his device at the Franklin Institute in that city.

After sailing to Europe in 1934, Farnsworth secured an agreement with Goerz-Bosch-Fernseh in Germany. Some image dissector cameras were used to broadcast the 1936 Olympic Games in Berlin.

Farnsworth returned to his laboratory, and by 1936 his company was regularly transmitting entertainment programs on an experimental basis. That same year, while working with University of Pennsylvania biologists, Farnsworth developed a process to sterilize milk using radio waves. He also invented a fog-penetrating beam for ships and airplanes.

In 1936, Collier's Weekly praised Farnsworth's work: "One of those amazing facts of modern life that just don't seem possible—namely, electrically scanned television that seems destined to reach your home next year, was largely given to the world by a nineteen-year-old boy from Utah ... Today, barely thirty years old he is setting the specialized world of science on its ears."

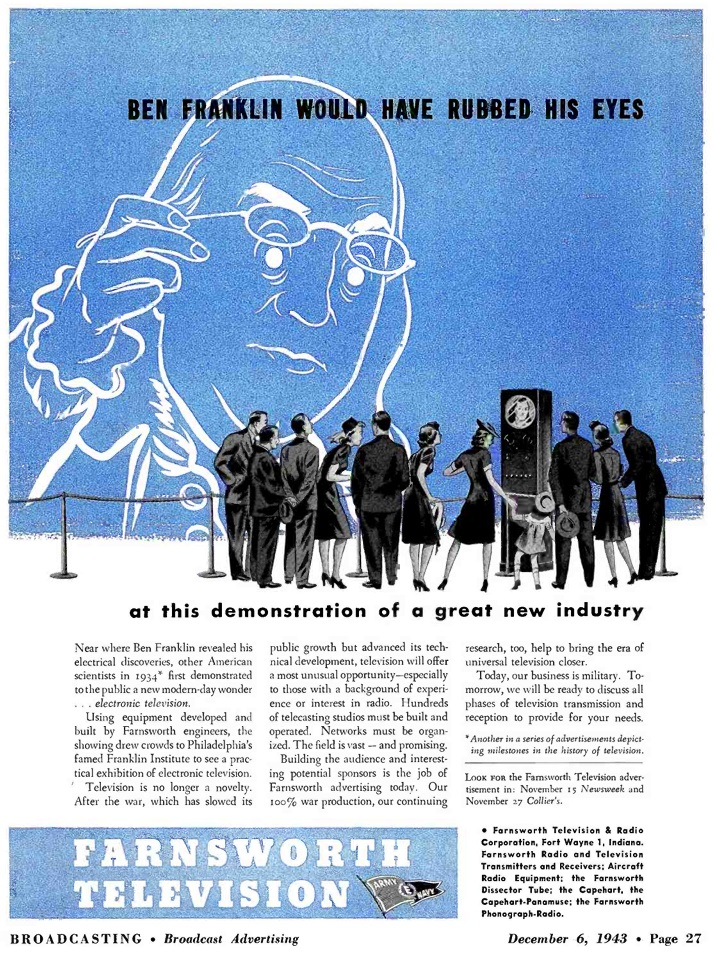
1943 company advertisement

In 1938, Farnsworth established the Farnsworth Television and Radio Corporation in Fort Wayne, Indiana, with E. A. Nicholas as president and himself as director of research. In September 1939, after a more than decade-long legal battle, RCA finally conceded to a multi-year licensing agreement concerning Farnsworth's 1927 patent for television totaling $1 million. RCA was then free, after showcasing electronic television at New York World's Fair on April 20, 1939, to sell electronic television cameras to the public.

Farnsworth Television and Radio Corporation was purchased by International Telephone and Telegraph (ITT) in 1951. During his time at ITT, Farnsworth worked in a basement laboratory known as "the cave" on Pontiac Street in Fort Wayne. From there, he introduced a number of breakthrough concepts, including a defense early warning signal, submarine detection devices, radar calibration equipment and an infrared telescope. "Philo was a very deep person—tough to engage in conversation, because he was always thinking about what he could do next", said Art Resler, an ITT photographer who documented Farnsworth's work in pictures. One of Farnsworth's most significant contributions at ITT was the PPI Projector, an enhancement on the iconic "circular sweep" radar display, which allowed safe air traffic control from the ground. This system developed in the 1950s was the forerunner of today's air traffic control systems.

In addition to his electronics research, ITT management agreed to nominally fund Farnsworth's nuclear fusion research. He and staff members invented and refined a series of fusion reaction tubes called "fusors". For scientific reasons unknown to Farnsworth and his staff, the necessary reactions lasted no longer than thirty seconds. In December 1965, ITT came under pressure from its board of directors to terminate the expensive project and sell the Farnsworth subsidiary. It was only due to the urging of president Harold Geneen that the 1966 budget was accepted, extending ITT's fusion research for an additional year. The stress associated with this managerial ultimatum, however, caused Farnsworth to suffer a relapse. A year later he was terminated and eventually allowed medical retirement.

In 1967, Farnsworth and his family moved back to Utah to continue his fusion research at Brigham Young University, which presented him with an honorary doctorate. The university also offered him office space and an underground concrete bunker for the project. Realizing ITT would dismantle its fusion lab, Farnsworth invited staff members to accompany him to Salt Lake City, as team members in Philo T. Farnsworth Associates (PTFA). By late 1968, the associates began holding regular business meetings and PTFA was underway. They promptly secured a contract with the National Aeronautics and Space Administration (NASA), and more possibilities were within reach—but financing stalled for the $24,000 a month required for salaries and equipment rental.

In a 1996 videotaped interview by the Academy of Television Arts & Sciences, Farnsworth's wife recounted his change of heart about the value of television, after seeing Neil Armstrong becoming the first person to walk on the Moon in real time on July 20, 1969, along with millions of others: "We were watching it, and, when Neil Armstrong landed on the moon, Phil turned to me and said, 'Pem, this has made it all worthwhile.' Before then, he wasn't too sure."

By Christmas 1970, PTFA had failed to secure the necessary financing, and the Farnsworths had sold all their own ITT stock and cashed in Philo's life insurance policy to maintain organizational stability. The underwriter had failed to provide the financial backing that was to have supported the organization during its critical first year. The banks called in all outstanding loans, repossession notices were placed on anything not previously sold, and the Internal Revenue Service put a lock on the laboratory door until delinquent taxes were paid. In January 1971, PTFA disbanded.

Farnsworth became dependant on alcohol in his later years.

He became seriously ill with pneumonia, and died on March 11, 1971, aged 64, at his home in Holladay, Utah. He was survived by his wife and their two sons.

Farnsworth's wife Elma Gardner "Pem" Farnsworth fought for decades after his death to assure his place in history. Farnsworth always gave her equal credit for creating television, saying, "My wife and I started this TV." She died on April 27, 2006, at age 98.

In 1999, Time magazine included Farnsworth in the "Time 100: The Most Important People of the Century".

== Inventions ==
=== Electronic television ===
Farnsworth worked out the principle of the image dissector in the summer of 1921, not long before his 15th birthday, and demonstrated the first working version on September 7, 1927, having turned 21 the previous August. A farm boy, his inspiration for scanning an image as a series of lines came from the back-and-forth motion used to plow a field. In the course of a patent interference suit brought by the Radio Corporation of America in 1934 and decided in February 1935, his high school chemistry teacher, Justin Tolman, produced a sketch he had made of a blackboard drawing Farnsworth had shown him in spring 1922. Farnsworth won the suit; RCA appealed the decision in 1936 and lost. Farnsworth received royalties from RCA, but he never became wealthy. The video camera tube that evolved from the combined work of Farnsworth, Zworykin, and many others was used in all television cameras until the late 20th century, when alternate technologies such as charge-coupled devices began to appear.

Farnsworth also developed the "image oscillite", a cathode ray tube that displayed the images captured by the image dissector.

Farnsworth called his device an image dissector because it converted individual elements of the image into electricity one at a time. He replaced the spinning disks with cesium, an element that emits electrons when exposed to light.

In 1984, Farnsworth was inducted into the National Inventors Hall of Fame.

=== Fusor ===
The Farnsworth fusor is an apparatus designed by Farnsworth to create nuclear fusion. Unlike most controlled fusion systems, which slowly heat a magnetically confined plasma, the fusor injects high-temperature ions directly into a reaction chamber, thereby avoiding a considerable amount of complexity.

When the Farnsworth fusor was first introduced to the fusion research world in the late 1960s, the fusor was the first device that could clearly demonstrate it was producing fusion reactions at all. Hopes at the time were high that it could be quickly developed into a practical power source. However, as with other fusion experiments, development into a power source has proven difficult. Nevertheless, the fusor has since become a practical neutron source and is produced commercially for this role.

=== Other inventions ===
At the time he died, Farnsworth held 300 U.S. and foreign patents. His inventions contributed to the development of radar, infra-red night vision devices, the electron microscope, the baby incubator, the gastroscope, and the astronomical telescope.

== TV appearance ==
Although he was the man responsible for its technology, Farnsworth appeared only once on a television program. On July 3, 1957, he was a mystery guest ("Doctor X") on the CBS quiz show I've Got A Secret. He fielded questions from the panel as they unsuccessfully tried to guess his secret ("I invented electronic television."). For stumping the panel, he received $80 and a carton of Winston cigarettes. Host Garry Moore then spent a few minutes discussing with Farnsworth his research on such projects as an early analog high-definition television system, flat-screen receivers, and fusion power. Farnsworth said, "There had been attempts to devise a television system using mechanical disks and rotating mirrors and vibrating mirrors—all mechanical. My contribution was to take out the moving parts and make the thing entirely electronic, and that was the concept that I had when I was just a freshman in high school in the Spring of 1921 at age 14."

A letter to the editor of the Idaho Falls Post Register disputed that Farnsworth had made only one television appearance. Roy Southwick claimed "... I interviewed Mr. [Philo] Farnsworth back in 1953—the first day KID-TV went on the air." KID-TV, which later became KIDK-TV, was then located near the Rigby area where Farnsworth grew up.

== Legacy ==
=== Honors ===
- In 1967, Farnsworth was issued an honorary degree by Brigham Young University, which he had briefly attended after graduating from Brigham Young High School.
- In 2006, Farnsworth was posthumously presented the Eagle Scout award when it was discovered he had earned it but had never been presented with it. The award was presented to his wife, Pem, who died four months later.
- Farnsworth was posthumously inducted into the Broadcast Pioneers of Philadelphia Hall of Fame in 2006.
- He was inducted into the Television Academy Hall of Fame in 2013.
- He is recognized in the Hall of Fame of the Indiana Broadcast Pioneers—which notes that, in addition to his inventive accomplishments, his company owned and operated WGL radio in Fort Wayne, Indiana.

=== Memorials ===
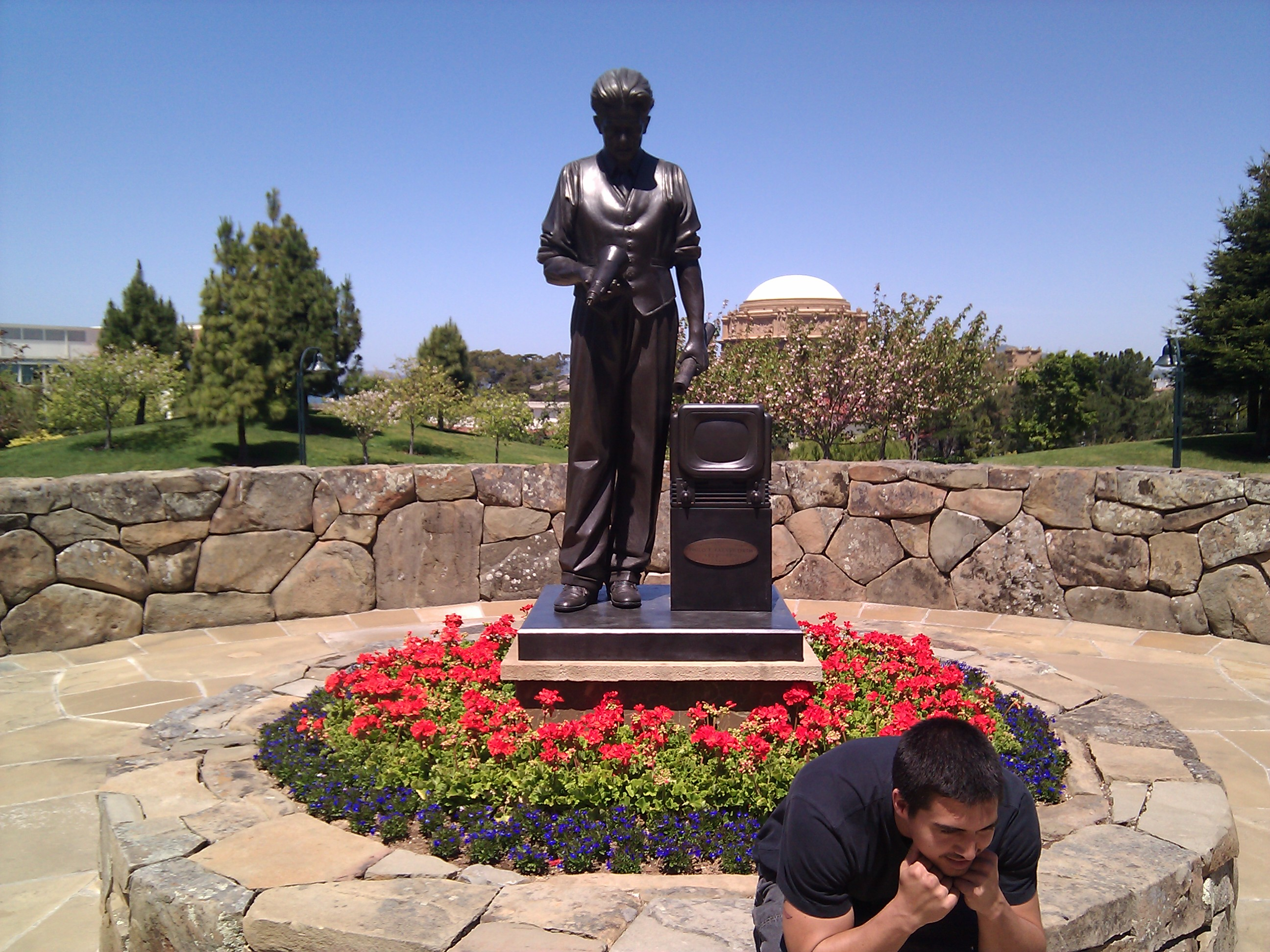
Statue of Philo T. Farnsworth at the Letterman Digital Arts Center in San Francisco

- A bronze statue of Philo T. Farnsworth represented the U.S. state of Utah formerly in the National Statuary Hall, located inside of the U.S. Capitol, since 1990. On January 28, 2018, despite there being an extended debate as well as sizable public opposition against the decision, the Utah State Legislature still voted to replace it with a statue of Martha Hughes Cannon. As of December 11, 2024, the Martha Hughes Cannon statue was gifted by the state of Utah and officially unveiled in the U.S. Capitol's National Statuary Hall at the Emancipation Hall of the United States Capitol Visitor Center, Standing along in addition with the statue of Brigham Young, with the two statues representing the state of Utah.
- Another statue sits inside the Utah State Capitol, in Salt Lake City.
- A Pennsylvania Historical and Museum Commission marker located at 1260 E. Mermaid Lane, Wyndmoor, Pennsylvania, commemorates Farnsworth's television work there in the 1930s. The Plaque reads "Inventor of electronic television, he led some of the first experiments in live local TV broadcasting in the late 1930s from his station W3XPF located on this site. A pioneer in electronics, Farnsworth held many patents and was inducted into the Inventors Hall of Fame."
- On September 15, 1981, a plaque honoring Farnsworth as The Genius of Green Street was placed on the 202 Green Street location (37.80037°N 122.40251°W) of his research laboratory in San Francisco by the California State Department of Parks and recreation.
- In October 2008, the Letterman Digital Arts Center in San Francisco installed a statue of Farnsworth sculpted by Lawrence Noble in front of its D building.
- A plaque honoring Farnsworth is located next to his former home at 734 E. State Blvd, in a historical district on the southwest corner of E. State and St. Joseph Blvds in Fort Wayne, Indiana.
- Farnsworth is one of the inventors honored with a plaque in the Walt Disney World's "Inventor's Circle" in Future World West in EPCOT.
- A 1983 United States postage stamp honored Farnsworth.
- On January 10, 2011, Farnsworth was inducted by Mayor Gavin Newsom into the newly established San Francisco Hall of Fame, in the science and technology category.
- Farnsworth's television-related work, including an original TV tube he developed, are on display at the Farnsworth TV & Pioneer Museum in Rigby, Idaho.

=== Things named after Farnsworth ===
- The Philo T. Farnsworth Award is one of the Primetime Engineering Emmy Awards given to honor companies and organizations that have significantly affected the state of television and broadcast engineering over a long period of time.
- The Philo Awards (officially Philo T. Farnsworth Awards, not to be confused with the one above) is an annual public-access television cable TV competition within the Ohio, Indiana, Kentucky, and Michigan region, where the winners receive notice for their efforts in various categories in producing community media.
- Philo, a streaming television provider based in San Francisco, California where his lab was located, is named for Farnsworth.
- Farnsworth Peak on the northern end of the Oquirrh Mountains, approximately 18 miles (29 km) southwest of Salt Lake City, Utah, is the location of many of the area's television and FM radio transmitters.
- The scenic "Farnsworth Steps" in San Francisco lead from Willard Street (just above Parnassus) up to Edgewood Avenue.
- Several buildings and streets around rural Brownfield, Maine are named for Farnsworth as he lived there for some time.
- The Philo T. Farnsworth Elementary School of the Jefferson Joint School District in Rigby, Idaho (later becoming a middle school) is named in his honor.
- While Philo T. Farnsworth Elementary School in the Granite School District in West Valley City, Utah is named after his cousin by the same name who was a former school district administrator.

=== In popular culture ===
- In "Cliff Gardner", the October 19, 1999, second episode of Aaron Sorkin's television comedy Sports Night, William H. Macy's character, Sam, delivers an extended monologue recounting Farnsworth's invention of television and the assistance provided to him by Cliff Gardner.
- The eccentric broadcast engineer in the 1989 film UHF is named Philo in tribute to Farnsworth.
- In "Levers, Beakmania, & Television", the November 14, 1992 season 1 episode of Beakman's World, Paul Zaloom appears as the "guest scientist" Philo T. Farnsworth explaining his most notable invention.
- A fictionalized representation of Farnsworth appears in Canadian writer Wayne Johnston's 1994 novel, Human Amusements. The main character in the novel appears as the protagonist in a television show that features Farnsworth as the main character. In the show, an adolescent Farnsworth invents many different devices (television among them) while being challenged at every turn by a rival inventor.
- The Futurama character Professor Farnsworth, who first appeared in 1999, is named after and partially inspired by Philo Farnsworth, and in the episode "All the Presidents' Heads" was revealed to have descended from him.
- Farnsworth and the introduction of television are significant plot elements in Carter Beats the Devil, a novel by Glen David Gold published in 2001 by Hyperion.
- The Farnsworth Invention, a stage play by Aaron Sorkin that debuted in 2007 after Sorkin adapted it from his unproduced screenplay, dramatized the conflict arising from Farnsworth's invention of TV and the alleged stealing of the design by David Sarnoff of RCA.
- The 2009 SyFy television series Warehouse 13 features a video communicator called "The Farnsworth". In the show's universe, this was designed by Philo Farnsworth.
- In the video game Trenched, renamed as Iron Brigade, the main antagonist is a character named Vladimir Farnsworth, who created mechanical enemies known as "Tubes" that spread a deadly broadcast. This character name alludes to Philo Farnsworth and Vladimir K. Zworykin, who invented the iconoscope.
- The 2009 animated film Cloudy with a Chance of Meatballs stars an amateur scientist and inventor named Flint Lockwood, who idolizes notable scientists and inventors. On his bedroom walls are images of Alexander Graham Bell, Thomas Edison, Nikola Tesla, Albert Einstein, Isaac Newton and Philo Farnsworth.
- For the 77th Primetime Emmy Awards in 2025, host Nate Bargatze portrayed Farnsworth in a skit to open the show.

== Fort Wayne sites ==
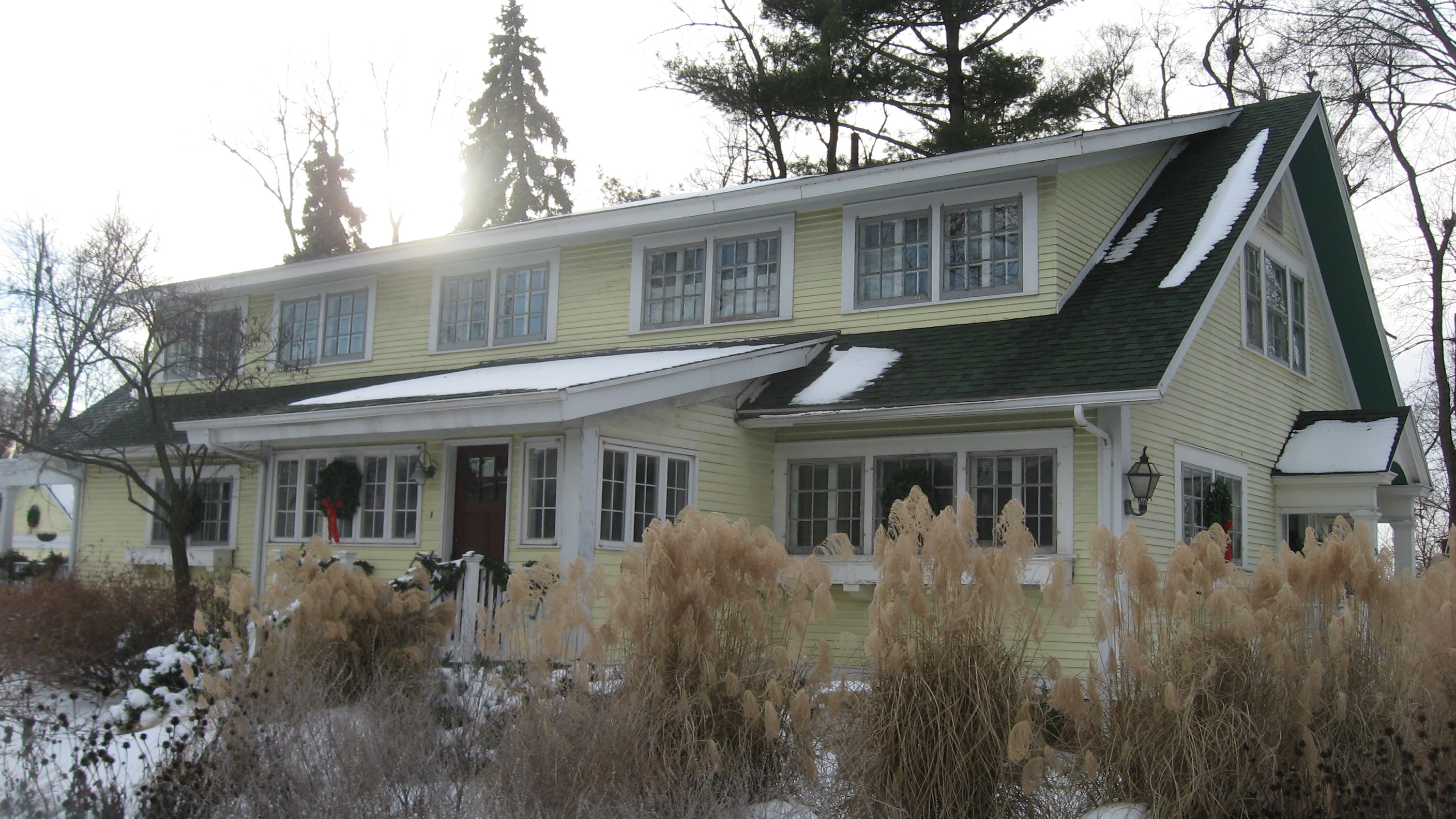
Farnsworth's house in Fort Wayne

In 2010, the former Farnsworth factory in Fort Wayne, Indiana, was razed, eliminating the "cave," where many of Farnsworth's inventions were first created, and where its radio and television receivers and transmitters, television tubes, and radio-phonographs were mass-produced under the Farnsworth, Capehart, and Panamuse trade names. The facility was located at 3702 E. Pontiac St.

Also that year, additional Farnsworth factory artifacts were added to the Fort Wayne History Center's collection, including a radio-phonograph and three table-top radios from the 1940s, as well as advertising and product materials from the 1930s to the 1950s.

Farnsworth's Fort Wayne residence from 1948 to 1967, then the former Philo T. Farnsworth Television Museum, stands at 734 E. State Blvd, on the southwest corner of E. State and St. Joseph Blvds. The residence is recognized by an Indiana state historical marker and was listed on the National Register of Historic Places in 2013.

== Marion, Indiana factory ==
In addition to Fort Wayne, Farnsworth operated a factory in Marion, Indiana, that made shortwave radios used by American combat soldiers in World War II. Acquired by RCA after the war, the facility was located at 3301 S. Adams St.

== Patents ==
- U.S. Patent 1,773,980 Archived October 21, 2013, at the Wayback Machine: Television system (filed January 7, 1927, issued August 26, 1930)
- U.S. patent 1,773,981: Television receiving system (filed January 7, 1927, issued August 26, 1930)
- U.S. patent 1,758,359: Electric oscillator system (filed January 7, 1927, issued May 13, 1930)
- U.S. patent 1,806,935: Light valve (filed January 7, 1927, issued May 26, 1931)
- U.S. patent 2,168,768: Television method (filed January 9, 1928, issued August 8, 1939)
- U.S. patent 1,970,036: Photoelectric apparatus (filed January 9, 1928, issued August 14, 1934)
- U.S. patent 2,246,625: Television scanning and synchronization system (filed May 5, 1930, issued June 24, 1941)
- U.S. patent 1,941,344: Dissector target (filed July 7, 1930, issued December 26, 1933)
- U.S. patent 2,140,284: Projecting oscillight (filed July 14, 1931, issued December 13, 1938)
- U.S. patent 2,059,683: Scanning oscillator (filed April 3, 1933, issued November 3, 1936)
- U.S. patent 2,087,683: Image dissector (filed April 26, 1933, issued July 20, 1937)
- U.S. patent 2,071,516: Oscillation generator (filed July 5, 1934, issued February 23, 1937)
- U.S. patent 2,143,145: Projection means (filed November 6, 1934, issued January 10, 1939)
- U.S. patent 2,233,887: Image projector (filed February 6, 1935, issued March 4, 1941)
- U.S. patent 2,143,262: Means of electron multipaction (filed March 12, 1935, issued January 10, 1939)
- U.S. patent 2,174,488: Oscillator (filed March 12, 1935, issued September 26, 1939)
- U.S. patent 2,221,473: Amplifier (filed March 12, 1935, issued November 12, 1940)
- U.S. patent 2,155,478: Means for producing incandescent images (filed May 7, 1935, issued April 25, 1939)
- U.S. patent 2,140,695: Charge storage dissector (filed July 6, 1935, issued December 20, 1938)
- U.S. patent 2,228,388: Cathode ray amplifier (filed July 6, 1935, issued January 14, 1941)
- U.S. patent 2,233,888: Charge storage amplifier (filed July 6, 1935, issued March 4, 1941)
- U.S. patent 2,251,124: Cathode ray amplifying tube (filed August 10, 1935, issued July 29, 1941)
- U.S. patent 2,100,842: Charge storage tube (filed September 14, 1935, issued November 30, 1937)
- U.S. patent 2,137,528: Multipactor oscillator (filed January 27, 1936, issued November 22, 1938)
- U.S. patent 2,214,077: Scanning current generator (filed February 10, 1936, issued September 10, 1940)
- U.S. Patent 2,089,054 Archived October 21, 2013, at the Wayback Machine: Incandescent light source (filed March 9, 1936, issued August 3, 1937)
- U.S. patent 2,159,521: Absorption oscillator (filed March 9, 1936, issued May 23, 1939)
- U.S. patent 2,139,813: Secondary emission electrode (filed March 24, 1936, issued December 13, 1938)
- U.S. patent 2,204,479: Means and method for producing electronic multiplication (filed May 16, 1936, issued June 11, 1940)
- U.S. patent 2,140,832: Means and method of controlling electron multipliers (filed May 16, 1936, issued December 20, 1938)
- U.S. patent 2,260,613: Electron multiplier (filed May 18, 1936, issued October 28, 1941)
- U.S. Patent 2,141,837 Archived October 21, 2013, at the Wayback Machine: Multistage multipactor (filed June 1, 1936, issued December 27, 1938)
- U.S. patent 2,216,265: Image dissector (filed August 18, 1936, issued October 1, 1940)
- U.S. patent 2,128,580: Means and method of operating electron multipliers (filed August 18, 1936, issued August 30, 1938)
- U.S. patent 2,143,146: Repeater (filed October 31, 1936, issued January 10, 1939)
- U.S. patent 2,139,814: Cathode ray tube (filed November 2, 1936, issued December 13, 1938)
- U.S. patent 2,109,289: High power projection oscillograph (filed November 2, 1936, issued February 22, 1938)
- U.S. patent 2,184,910: Cold cathode electron discharge tube (filed November 4, 1936, issued December 26, 1939)
- U.S. patent 2,179,996: Electron multiplier (filed November 9, 1936, issued November 14, 1939)
- U.S. patent 2,221,374: X-ray projection device
- U.S. patent 2,263,032: Cold cathode electron discharge tube
- U.S. patent 3,258,402: Electric discharge device for producing interaction between nuclei
- U.S. patent 3,386,883: Method and apparatus for producing nuclear fusion reactions
- U.S. patent 3,664,920: Electrostatic containment in fusion reactors

== See also ==
- History of television
