= Mary Isabella Hales Horne =

American religious leader

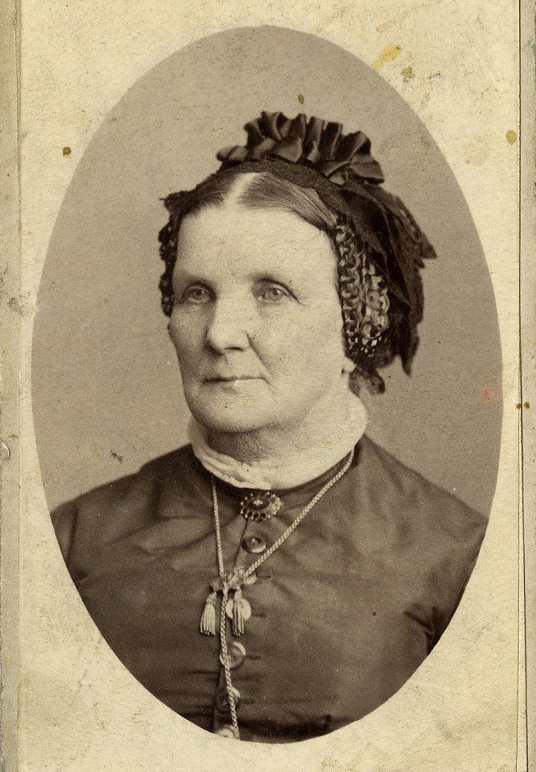
- Born: Mary Isabella Hales; November 20, 1818; Rainham, Kent, England
- Died: August 25, 1905 (aged 86); Salt Lake City, Utah, U.S.

Mary Isabella Hales Horne (November 20, 1818 – August 25, 1905) was a prominent leader in many different capacities in the Church of Jesus Christ of Latter-day Saints. During her lifetime she served as a Relief Society president at the Ward and Stake levels. She also made her voice heard with regards to the federal restraints on polygamy and women's rights.

== Family life ==
Mary Isabella Hales was the eldest of seven children born to Stephen and Mary Ann Hales in Rainham, Kent, England. The family left England for York (Toronto, Canada) when Mary was 14 years old. As her parents were both Christians, Mary went to a Methodist camp in 1834, where she met Joseph Horne. They were married on May 9, 1836. That same year, Mary, her husband, and her father's entire family listened to LDS missionaries (Orson Pratt and Parley P. Pratt) and were baptized two months later. They gathered with the LDS saints in Missouri where they faced persecution, and later relocated to Quincy, Illinois, and Nauvoo.

En route from Nauvoo to Iowa, Horne gave birth to a daughter. After spending the winter in Winter Quarters, they joined the Edward Hunter's hundred and made their way to the Salt Lake Valley. They arrived on October 6, 1847. The Hornes were the parents of 15 children, including three sets of twins.

== Church service ==
Horne joined the Relief Society in January 1846. Soon after, she was appointed as the president of the 14th Ward Relief Society and then as Stake Relief Society president from 1877 to 1903 in the Salt Lake stake. In 1870, Brigham Young asked Horne to lead the Retrenchment movement, which pushed for women in the Relief Society to spend more time on spiritual growth and less time on daily household chores. In 1880, the Retrenchment group also began speaking in favor of plural marriage. She served in this capacity until 1904. Horne served as treasurer for the Central Board of Relief Society beginning on July 1, 1880 and was released in 1901.

== Other leadership roles ==
In 1876, she was elected as vice-president of the Utah Silk Association organized by Brigham Young and headed by other prominent LDS church leaders including Zina D. H. Young, General Relief Society president. Horne was involved in the woman's suffrage movement. At a mass meeting in 1886, discussing injustices to women, she was nominated by Dr. Romania Pratt as chairman of the meeting. For the World's fair, Horne was chairman of the philanthropies and charities committee of the women of Utah. Horne was a chairman on the Deseret Hospital board of directors 1882–1894. She also created a nurse training program which was later adopted more generally by the general officers of the Relief Society.
