= Autobiography of Parley Parker Pratt =

1874 autobiography by Parley P. Pratt

The Autobiography of Parley Parker Pratt, One of the Twelve Apostles of the Church of Jesus Christ of Latter-day Saints, Embracing His Life, Ministry and Travels, with Extracts in Prose and Verse, from his Miscellaneous Writings
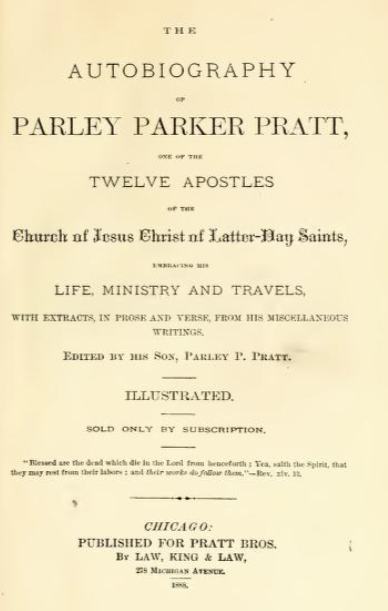
- Title page for Autobiography of Parley Parker Pratt (1874)
- Author: Parley P. Pratt
- Language: English
- Publisher: Russell Brothers
- Publication date: 1874
- Publication place: United States
- Pages: 502; xv

The Autobiography of Parley Parker Pratt is the 1874 posthumous autobiography of Latter Day Saint apostle Parley P. Pratt. It was compiled from Pratt's writings by Pratt's son, Parley P. Pratt Jr., with assistance from his wife and apostle John Taylor.

The Autobiography is the most frequently read of Pratt's several works, and it has been suggested that "excluding Lucy Mack Smith's Biographical Sketches ..., it is possibly the most important [Latter Day Saint] historical work written in the nineteenth century". The same author states that due to its accessible prose, it "remains one of the most frequently read texts for Latter-day Saints even in the twenty-first century".
