= Joshua Hughes Paul =

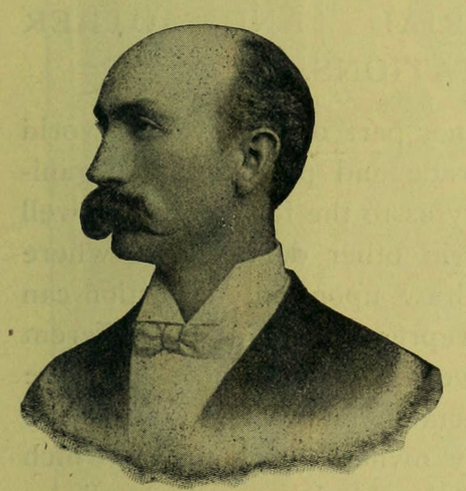
Portrait from Utah as it is (1904)

Joshua Hughes Paul (20 January 1863 - 6 March 1939) was a Mormon university president, newspaper editor and Latter-Day Saints missionary. Born in Salt Lake City, Utah, to Mormon pioneer James Patten Paul and Elizabeth Evans, the stepfather and mother of Martha Hughes Cannon, JH Paul as a boy herded cows for Mormon President Brigham Young. After learning carpentry from his father, he worked at the Salt Lake Brewery before entering the Latter-day Saints University in the same city; because the former did not award degrees at the time, he continued his studies at Illinois Wesleyan University, where he graduated in 1905.

== University career ==
After graduation, Joshua Hughes Paul became an instructor and later professor at the University of Utah. From 1891 to 1894, he was President of the Brigham Young College (later Brigham Young University, at Provo, Utah, where he contributed greatly to the growth of the institution; President of the Agricultural College of Utah (now Utah State University) from 1895 to 1897; President of the Latter-day Saints College from 1899 to 1926, and then a teacher at the University of Utah until 1926.

== Newspaper editor ==
In 1890, Professor Paul was associate editor of the Salt Lake Herald, and in 1900 he briefly worked in the same position at the Deseret News.

== Other activities ==
In 1928 and 1930, Paul ran for Congress as a Democratic nominee.

Between 1929 and 1932, Paul oversaw old-age pensions in Salt Lake City.
