= Margaret C. Roberts =

American obstetrician (1846–1926)

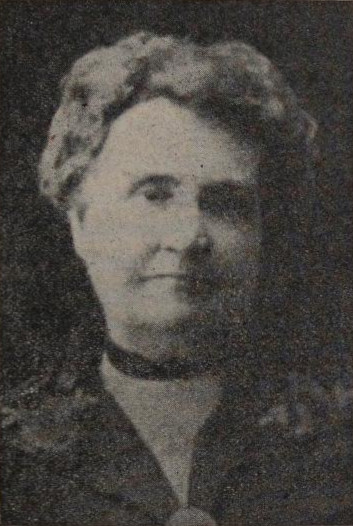
- Dr. Margaret C. Roberts
- Born: Margaret Curtis; December 17, 1846; St. Louis, Missouri
- Died: March 13, 1926 (aged 79); New York City, New York
- Occupation: Obstetrician
- Spouses: Milford Bard Shipp (m. 1867; div. 1888); B. H. Roberts (m. 1923)
- Children: 9

Margaret Curtis Shipp Roberts (December 17, 1846 – March 13, 1926) was an American obstetrician and one of the first women from Utah to receive a medical degree. She was urged to study medicine by Brigham Young, the leader of the Church of Jesus Christ of Latter-day Saints, to address increasing rates of mortality during childbirth. She worked in private practice from 1883 to 1922 and trained over 600 nurses and midwives at the Relief Society Nursing School from 1899 to 1919. In 1888, she founded and served as editor of the Salt Lake Sanitarian, one of the first medical journals in Utah. She was in a polygamous marriage to B.H. Roberts, who was elected Congressman for Utah's at-large district; however, the House of Representatives refused to seat him due to his polygamy.

== Early life and education ==
Margaret Curtis was the second child of Margaret (née Martin) and Theodore Curtis. She was born on December 17, 1846, in St. Louis, Missouri, and moved with her family to Utah. Her parents worked in wool carding and tailoring once in Utah.

When Roberts was a child, she was invited by Brigham Young to attend school with his children. Her father entered into plural marriage with Jane Mace in 1861, exposing Roberts to polygamy at a young age.

Due to increasing mortality rates for infants and mothers during childbirth, LDS leader Brigham Young called for women in polygamous relationships who had already had children to travel to Philadelphia and obtain their medical degrees at the Women's Medical College of Pennsylvania. Roberts was the second to attend in 1875 after Romania B. Pratt Penrose, but returned home shortly after due to homesickness. Her husband's first polygamous wife, Ellis Reynolds Shipp, took her spot at the school. Eventually, Roberts returned to Philadelphia and obtained her Doctor in Medicine degree in 1883.

== Career ==
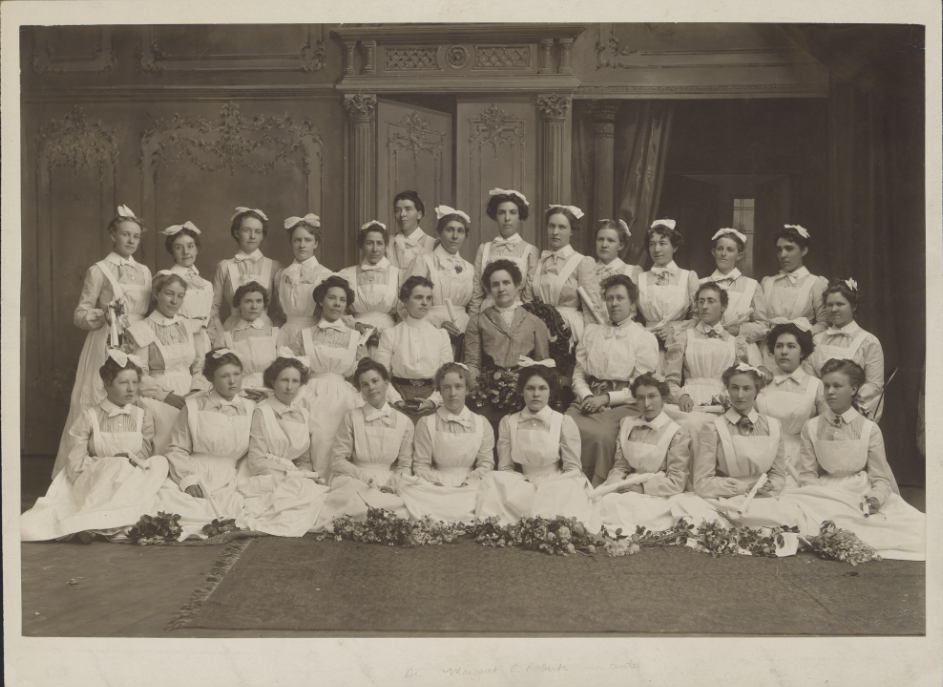
Dr. Margaret C. Roberts with 1900 Relief Society Nursing Class

She worked as a traveling doctor and conducted minor surgery in Salt Lake County, Utah. With the help of Romania Pratt Penrose, Roberts established a private practice from 1883 to 1922. She helped establish the Relief Society Nurse School and taught nursing courses from 1899 until 1919. She taught over 300 nurses and almost as many midwives at the Relief Society Nurse School by 1915. The school was discontinued in 1924 due to objections from the National Hospital Training School Rating Bureau.

In 1888, Roberts was one of the founders of one of the first medical journals in Utah, the Salt Lake Sanitarian, with her husband Milford Shipp and Ellis Reynolds Shipp. The three served as editors of the journal, but the journal only lasted three years, possibly due to contention between Roberts and Milford Shipp.

Roberts was also a member of the Authors' Club. As part of her work with the Young Ladies' Mutual Improvement Association, she gave lectures to young women around Utah.

Roberts died on March 13, 1926, in Brooklyn, Kings County, New York, and was interred in Salt Lake City.

== Personal life ==
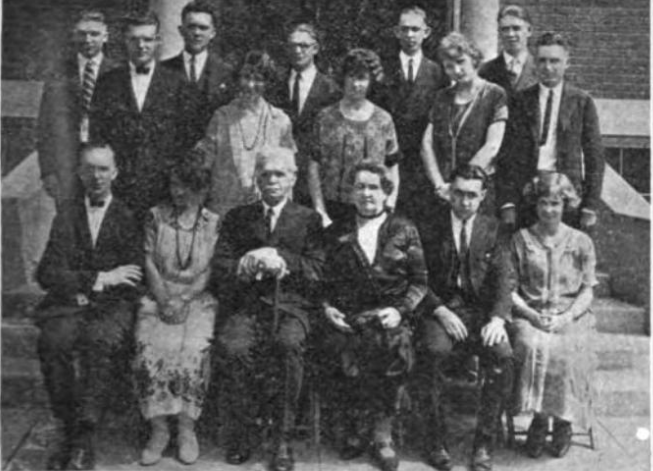
Margaret C. Roberts (front row third from the right) in the Eastern States Mission

At age 21, Roberts married Milford Bard Shipp on December 31, 1867, becoming his second wife (the first being Ellis Reynolds Shipp). After his marriage to Roberts, Milford Shipp also married Elizabeth Hillstead in 1871 and Mary Smith in 1873. With Milford Shipp, Roberts had nine children, although only three lived to adulthood. Because of her struggle with the early deaths of her children and Milford Shipp's lack of support, Roberts went to Wilford Woodruff, president of the LDS Church at the time, to cancel her marriage officially on June 15, 1888.

After she canceled her marriage with Milford Shipp, she met and married B. H. Roberts. The date of Roberts's marriage to B. H. Roberts is contested because there are no marriage records, but most scholars agree that they were married after the 1890 Manifesto. B.H. Roberts was elected as a Democratic Congressman for Utah's at-large district, however the U.S. House of Representatives refused to seat him because of his polygamous marriage. They had no children together. In 1922, B. H. Roberts was called to be the Eastern States Mission President, and Margaret moved with him. She was an instructor in the Mission School and gave lectures on human anatomy, physiology and hygiene. After his first legal wife died, Margaret married B.H. Roberts civilly in Chicago on November 9, 1923.
