= Statue of Martha Hughes Cannon (Salt Lake City) =

Statue in Salt Lake City, Utah, U.S.

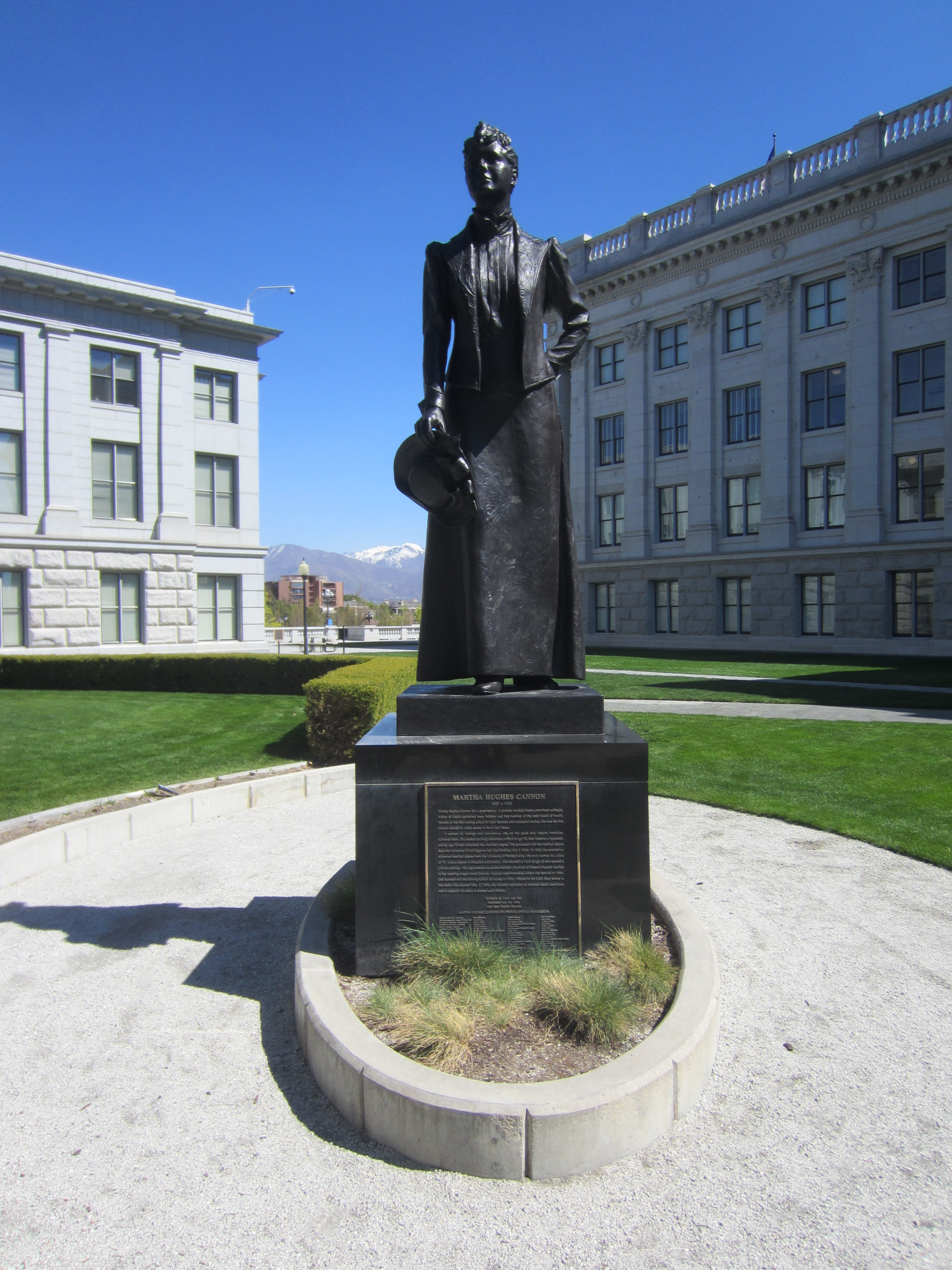
- The statue in 2021
- Artist: Laura Lee Stay Bradshaw
- Subject: Martha Hughes Cannon
- Location: Utah State Capitol; Salt Lake City; 40°46′40.5″N 111°53′16.6″W

A 1996 statue of Martha Hughes Cannon by Laura Lee Stay Bradshaw (born in 1958) is installed outside the Utah State Capitol in Salt Lake City, Utah.
