= Deseret Hospital =

Defunct hospital in Salt Lake City, Utah Territory, United States

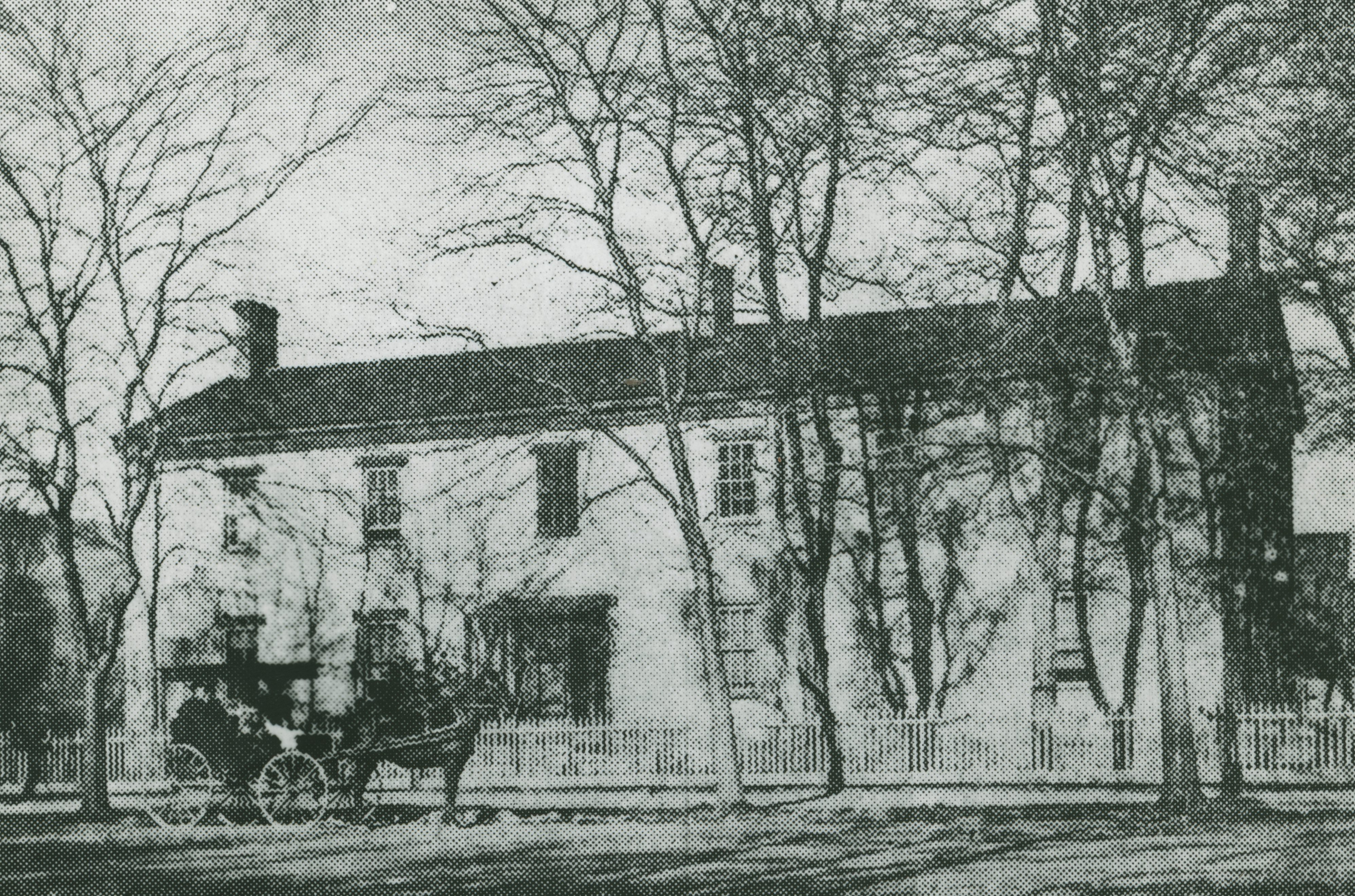
- The Deseret Hospital's second building (used from 1884 to 1893), across from Union Square

Geography
- Location: Salt Lake City, Utah Territory, United States
- Coordinates: 40°46′26.51″N 111°53′57.6″W

Organization
- Religious affiliation: The Church of Jesus Christ of Latter-day Saints (LDS Church)

History
- Opened: July 17, 1882
- Closed: November 1893

Links
- Lists: Hospitals in the United States
- Other links: List of hospitals in Utah

The Deseret Hospital was a hospital in Salt Lake City, Utah Territory which was operated by the Relief Society of the Church of Jesus Christ of Latter-day Saints (LDS Church). Established in 1882, the territory's pioneer women, including Romania B. Pratt, Ellis Reynolds Shipp, and Martha Hughes Cannon, played a significant role in the institution.

The hospital was closed in 1893, due to financial struggles. However, the women involved in the enterprise continued to provide both medical care and training in the community following the institution's closure.

== History ==
=== Medicine in the early Utah Territory period ===
The first European American settlers in Salt Lake Valley were Mormon pioneers (members of the LDS Church), who arrived in the region starting in 1847. These pioneers often relied on their faith rather than doctors – with some believing only the unfaithful used physicians, and thus there were few professional medical services available during the early decades of the settlement. This anti-doctor sentiment was especially prominent among some of the pioneers who were also believers in Thomsonianism, an early system of alternative medicine. These believers established the Council of Health and invited prominent leaders of the LDS Church to be part of the council, giving it some degree of credibility in the community.

As the community grew, medical research in the wider world was advancing, and, in 1870, the Deseret News (the church's newspaper) published an editorial by George Q. Cannon which discussed bacteria and encouraged learning of this medical discovery. Increases in medical knowledge brought a change in the sentiment of church leaders and during the 1870s, church president Brigham Young realized the need to train young men in medicine. Eliza R. Snow, a prominent leader of women in the church, also appealed to Young have young women educated in the same practice, to help with the community's high infant and maternity mortality rates. The Relief Society, a women's organization within the church, along with the Mutal Improvement organization, would help provide funds for women to attend medical training at schools in the eastern United States.

=== Establishment of Deseret Hospital ===
The first general hospital in Salt Lake City, St. Mark's Hospital, was established in 1872. However, it was not established by the LDS Church (the religion practiced by most of the region's citizens), but rather by the Episcopal Church. The Catholic Church established the city's second hospital, Holy Cross Hospital, in 1875.

Desiring to establish their own institution, and with permission from the church's First Presidency, a number of Latter-day Saints, mostly women, established the Deseret Hospital Association in May 1882. Women of the church could join the association for a $1 annual membership fee. The association put out appeals to the church's stakes and wards and their respective organizations for aid in establishing the hospital. This included requests for items such furniture, crockery ware, and bedding.

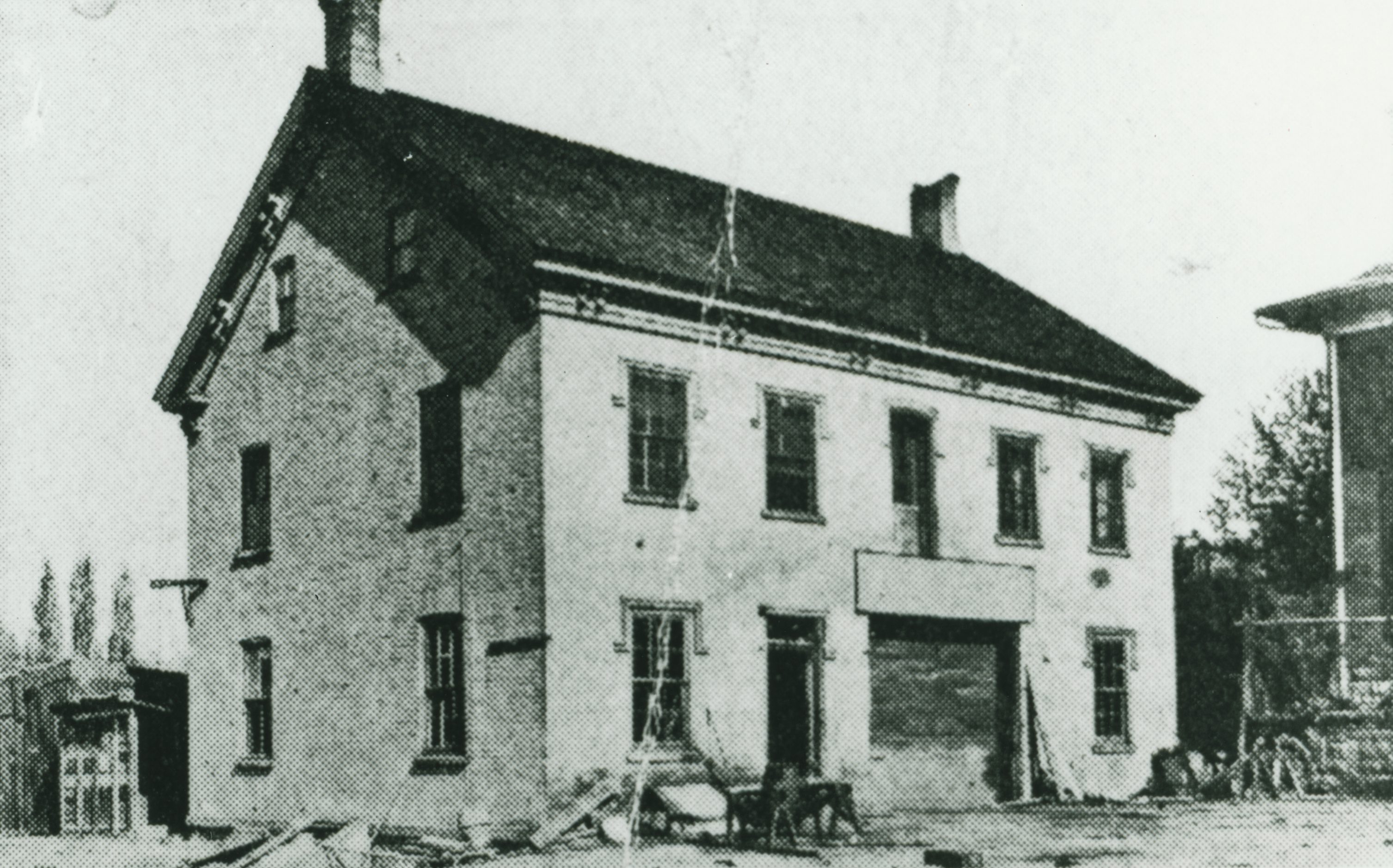
The first building used by Deseret Hospital on 500 East, after it had been converted to an auto repair shop (40.7680°N 111.8773°W)

A building on 500 East, which had been recently vacated by Holy Cross Hospital, was acquired for use as the Deseret Hospital. The new institution was dedicated on July 17, 1882. Franklin D. Richards, a church apostle, provided the dedicatory prayer and both church president, John Taylor, and Salt Lake City mayor, William Jennings, offered remarks congratulating and thanking the Relief Society women for the hospital. The physicians were then set apart by church leadership.

=== Daily operation of the hospital ===
At the hospital's establishment, the association's leadership included Eliza R. Snow (President), Zina D. H. Young (Vice President), Emmeline B. Wells (secretary), and board members included M. Isabella Horne, Bathsheba W. Smith, Jane S. Richards, along with other women from the city.

At its opening in 1882, the resident physician and surgeon was Dr. Ellen B. Ferguson, and Dr. Romania B. Pratt served as the visiting eye and ear surgeon. Doctors Seymour B. Young and Washington F. Anderson made up the visiting board. On a visit to the hospital in January 1883, a journalist from the Deseret News reported that Dr. Martha Paul Hughes had become the house physician and Dr. Ellis R. Shipp was a now among the visiting physicians.

In July 1884, two years after opening, the hospital was moved to a building across the street from Salt Lake City's Union Square. The building had previously been used to house institutions such as the Union Academy and University of Deseret. On the structure's first floor was a waiting room, dispensary, surgery on the south end, and the men's ward (with space for 8 beds) on the north end; this level also contained a platform where patients delivered via carriage could be transferred inside. Upstairs was the women's ward (with space for 12 beds), along with private rooms and a bath. The basement included a dining room, kitchen, and bedrooms for the hired help. Around this time, the institution also accepted students for preparatory instruction, in return for shifts working at the hospital.

In the fall of 1885, the hospital was raided by deputy marshals looking for Dr. Martha Hughes Cannon, as part of the federal government's anti-polygamy campaign.

=== Closure ===
The hospital was closed in November 1893, due to financial difficulties related to not having a regular endowment and to its building being unsuited to a healthcare facility. The decision to close was made between the hospital board and the church's First Presidency, with the hospital being roughly $1,500 in debt (equivalent to $53,750 in 2025) at the time.

After the closure, former staff members continued to practice medicine and train others at different locations in the city. For example, Dr. Pratt moved her practice into the Avenues neighborhood. A boy's school was opened in the former hospital building in 1895. (Note: This building, which had housed the Union Hotel, Union Academy, University of Deseret, and Deseret Hospital eventually became the long-time home of the Salt Lake Knitting Works, before being torn down in January 1936.)

== Replica ==
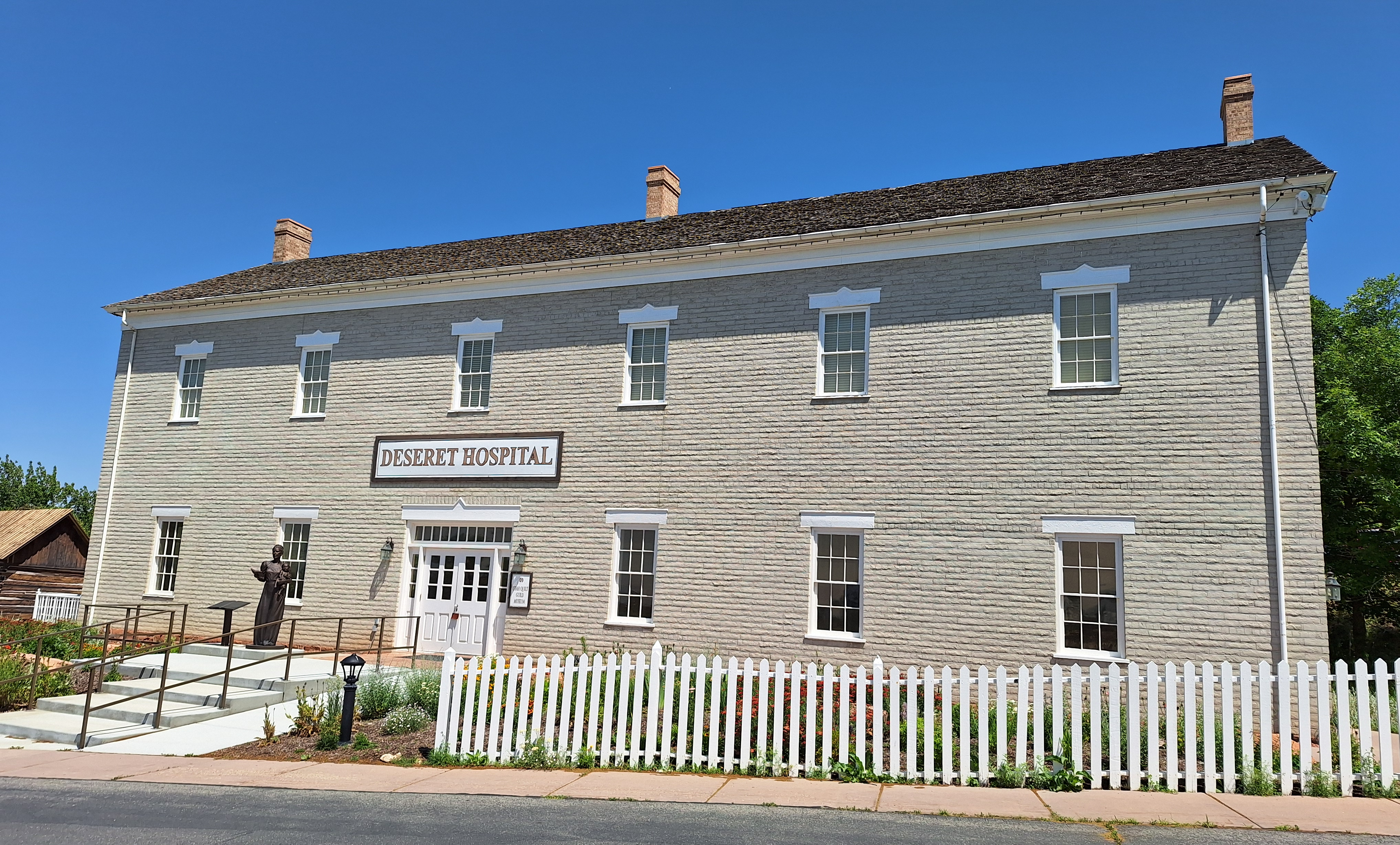
A replica of Deseret Hospital's second building is located at This Is the Place Heritage Park; a statue of Ellis Reynolds Shipp is located in front of the replica

In September 2002, officials at This Is the Place Heritage Park broke ground on a replica of the hospital's second building, which would become part of the park's Old Deseret Village. The completed building was dedicated October 25, 2003 by Russell M. Nelson, a leader of the LDS Church and heart surgeon by profession. The first floor of the replica features a reproduced infirmary of the correct time period, and the second floor is home to the Utah Quilt Guild's museum.

In September 2023, the park added a statue of Dr. Ellis R. Shipp in front of the hospital. The statue honors her as a midwife, delivering thousands of babies, and for her work training hundreds of other nurses and midwives.

== Bibliography ==
- Morrell, Joseph R. (1955). "Medicine of the Pioneer Period in Utah". Utah Historical Quarterly. 23. Utah State Historical Society: 127–144.
- Richards, Ralph T. (1953). Of Medicine, Hospitals, and Doctors. Salt Lake City: University of Utah Press.
