= Romania B. Pratt Penrose =

American physician

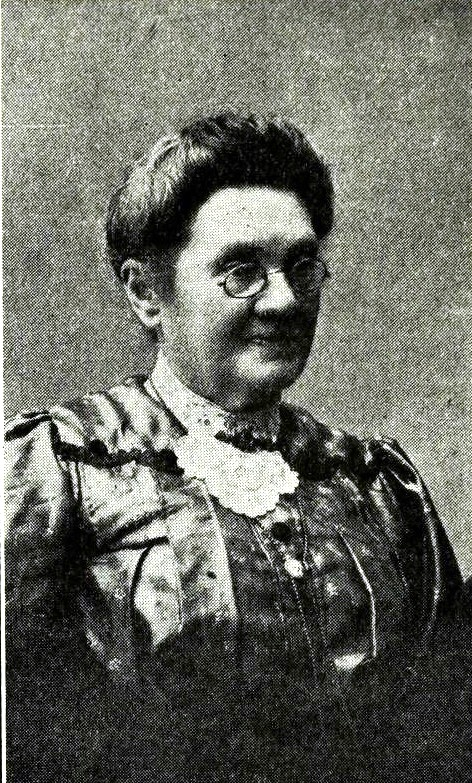

Personal details
- Born: Romania Bunnell; August 8, 1839; Washington Township, Wayne County, Indiana, United States
- Died: November 9, 1932 (aged 93); Salt Lake City, Utah, United States
- Resting place: Salt Lake City Cemetery; 40.777°N 111.858°W
- Alma mater: Women's Medical College of Pennsylvania
- Spouse(s): Parley P. Pratt Jr. Charles W. Penrose
- Children: 7
- Parents: Luther B. Bunnell; Esther Mendenhall
- Signature

Dr. Esther Romania Bunnell Pratt Penrose (August 8, 1839 – November 9, 1932) was a leading figure in Latter-day Saint (LDS) and Utah culture during the late 19th and early 20th centuries. She is widely known for being the first LDS woman to receive an MD degree and for being the first woman to be a medical doctor in the state of Utah.

== Early life ==
Romania Bunnell was born in Washington Township, Indiana to Luther B. Bunnell and his wife Esther Mendenhall. Romania's parents joined the LDS church sometime before 1845 and within a year her family had moved from Indiana to Nauvoo, Illinois in order to join with others of the LDS community. In 1846, after having endured constant religious persecution in Nauvoo, Romania's family, along with many other saints, journeyed to Winter Quarters. Bunnell's father feared his wife would die of ill health if they remained at Winter Quarters, and so despite pleas of Brigham Young to stay accompanied with a promise to build them a house quickly, Luther Bunnell took the family to New Market, Missouri. After a short stay here they went to Ohio, where Luther Bunnell had been born. After hearing stories of gold in California, Luther Bunnell went west in 1849, where he worked in gold diggings but died of typhoid fever in the process. Romania Bunnell and family then moved to Crawfordsville, Indiana. From the ages of ten to sixteen, Romania attended the Quaker-sponsored Western Agricultural School in Ohio and then the Female Seminary in Crawfordsville, Indiana.

Because of concerns regarding non-Mormon influences on her children, specifically that Romania would perhaps marry an admirer of another faith, her mother sold their home in Crawfordsville and moved her family to Utah. Romania Bunnell was baptized in Atchison, Kansas on May 31, 1855, shortly before moving to Utah Territory. She went west with her mother, sister, and two brothers in the John Hindley company. They traveled for four long months before arriving in the Salt Lake Valley. Shortly after arriving in Utah, Bunnell taught in Brigham Young's school. In 1857 Romania's mother went back to Indiana to collect money owed to the family and left Romania in charge of her younger siblings for six months. Then shortly after her mother's return the family relocated from Salt Lake City to Provo, Utah during the evacuation caused by the approach of Johnston's Army.

== Marriage and family ==
On February 23, 1859, she married her first husband, Parley P. Pratt Jr., the eldest son of Parley P. Pratt. Over the next several years Romania and Parley had seven children, five of whom lived to adulthood.

In 1881 Romania and Pratt were divorced. She married her second husband, Charles W. Penrose, on March 11, 1886. He would later be a member of the First Presidency of the LDS Church. She was his third wife.

== Becoming a medical doctor ==
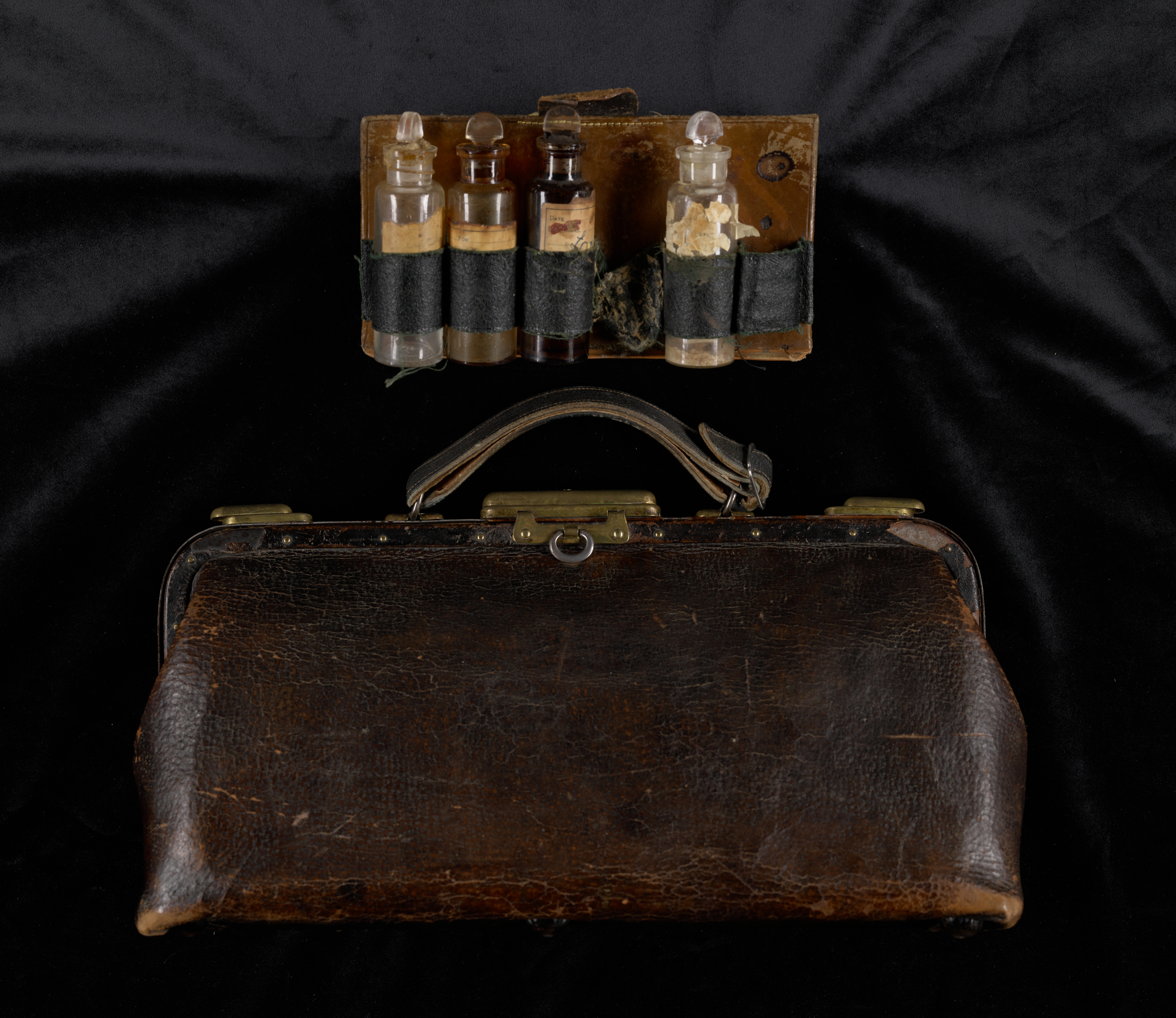
Midwife bag belonging to one of Penrose's students

In 1873 Romania heard President Brigham Young implore women of the church to study medicine. At this time there was a great need for trained female midwives and doctors in Utah because male doctors normally did not assist in treating women regardless of whether they were going through illness or childbirth. Prior to going to medical school in Philadelphia, Romania spent time in New York assisting her husband in editing his father, Parley P. Pratt's, autobiography. After working on the autobiography, she went to the Women's Medical College in New York City and later to the Women's Medical College of Pennsylvania, leaving her five children in the care of her mother. Her willingness to become a doctor was partly the result of having two children who died before the age of three. Knowing the pain that she went through with the loss of her young children, Romania did not want other mothers to experience that same heartache. With the understanding that there was a great need for more skilled doctors in Utah, she wanted to make a difference and help relieve suffering and pain whenever possible.

Romania showed great promise in her classes at the Women's Medical College in New York City during her first semester of observations, but she still felt that she was already lagging behind her classmates. During the summer following her first experience in college, Romania worked ardently to not only catch-up to her classmates but to surpass them in medical expertise. While they were enjoying summer vacation, Romania worked hard enough to be the first woman admitted to Bellevue College. She excelled in the area of dissection and was often used as a model student and praised by professors for her great work. After her first year of schooling, Romania was already out of money. She began counseling with Brigham Young about her financial predicament. In turn, he spoke with the President of the Relief Society Eliza R. Snow who, along with other Relief Society sisters in Zion, helped gather money to send Romania back to the east to finish her schooling. Being short on money, Romania returned to college in the east but did so at the Women's College of Pennsylvania.

While in school, Romania studied many different medical topics: surgery, diseases of women, anatomy, chemistry, toxicology, microscopy, obstetrics, etc. Early in her college years she found great interest in learning about the eye and ear, but could not yet choose a specialized field. During the summers she spent time at the hospital for women in Boston. On March 15, 1877, Romania graduated with her Doctorate in medicine. She was the first Mormon woman to earn a medical degree. Before returning home after graduation, Dr. Pratt stayed in Boston but now turned her focus to studies of the eye, ear, nose, and throat. After returning to Utah Territory, she trained women in medical fields, specifically midwifery. She also performed the first successful cataract surgery in the Midwest. Later on she would write informative medical articles for the Woman's Exponent and the Young Woman's Journal.

Romania continued to seek knowledge and occasionally would return to the east in order to attend lectures at the Eye and Ear Infirmary in New York.

== Church and medical leadership ==
Prior to taking up her study of medicine, Penrose had been the president of the Retrenchment Association of one of the wards in Salt Lake City. The Retrenchment Association was a predecessor of the LDS Church's Young Woman's Organization.

In 1881, Romania was called as the treasurer of the Young Ladies Mutual Improvement Association. In 1882 the Relief Society came into possession of an abandoned medical facility, and with donations to fund their work, were able to open the Deseret Hospital in Salt Lake City. Dr. Pratt specialized as an eye and ear surgeon in the Deseret Hospital until it closed due to lack of funding in 1893. Before the hospital was closed, she was on its board along with such other leading Mormon women as Phebe C. Woodruff, Ellis Shipp, Mary Isabella Hales Horne, Emmeline B. Wells, Zina D. H. Young, Jane S. Richards, Matilda M. Barratt, and Bathsheba Smith. Romania served as general secretary of the Relief Society on the Relief Society Central Board for more than 30 years. She was also one of three instructors for the Relief Society Nurses Department. In 1889 when Susa Young Gates started the Young Woman's Journal she recruited Penrose to write a column for it on health and hygiene.

From 1906 to 1910, Penrose accompanied her husband as he presided over the European Mission. She became the first wife of the mission president to be the president of the relief society in the European mission, as she oversaw the organization of LDS relief societies for the first time in Europe.

== Women's suffrage ==
Romania was involved in the women's suffrage movement. Early in 1882, Romania accompanied two Relief Society sisters, Zina D. H. Young and Ellen B. Ferguson, to New York in order to attend a Woman's Suffrage Convention. Prior to her attendance at the suffrage convention in New York, Romania published many articles in the Women's Exponent regarding the need for woman's suffrage. In 1907, while she served with her husband as he presided over the European Mission, she served as the Utah delegate to the International Woman Suffrage Alliance conference in Amsterdam.

== Death ==
After more than 35 years in the medical field, Dr. Pratt Penrose retired in 1912. Thirteen years after her retirement, Charles died on May 17, 1925. Romania outlived her husband by seven years and became blind with old age. She died at her son Mark's home in Salt Lake City on November 9, 1932, at the age of 93. She was buried at Salt Lake City Cemetery.
