= Statue of Martha Hughes Cannon (U.S. Capitol) =

Sculpture in Washington, D.C., U.S.

- Location: United States Capitol Visitor Center, Washington, D.C.
- Designer: Ben Hammond
- Dedicated date: 2024
- Dedicated to: Martha Hughes Cannon

A bronze sculpture of Martha Hughes Cannon by American sculptor Ben Hammond is installed in the United States Capitol Visitor Center, in Washington, D.C., United States. It was gifted by the U.S. state of Utah in 2024, replacing the statue of Philo T. Farnsworth, which the state had gifted in 1990.

== See also ==
- Statues of the National Statuary Hall Collection
- 2024 in art
