= Marianne Monson =

American writer (born 1975)

- Born: 1975 (age 50–51); Boston, Massachusetts, United States
- Education: Brigham Young University, Vermont College, Pacific University
- Occupations: Novelist, English Teacher
- Writing career
- Genres: Children's literature, fantasy, LDS fiction, Women's History
- Website: www.mariannemonson.com

Marianne Monson (1975) is an American author of women's history and children's books; and a teacher (currently at Clatsop Community College near her home in Astoria, Oregon). She is the founder of a literary nonprofit, The Writer's Guild.

== Education ==
She earned a BA in Honors English degree from BYU, a Master's degree in Creative Writing from Vermont College and a Master's in English pedagogy from Pacific University.

== Career ==
Monson was Managing Editor at Beyond Words Publishing, where she edited a number of best-selling titles. She has also taught English and creative writing at Portland Community College and at BYU-Hawaii. She has written and published several books for adults and children as well as historical articles in Rain Magazine, Coast Weekend, Our Coast; she has also published in the Ensign and Friend magazines of the Church of Jesus Christ of Latter-day Saints (her faith).

Among the twelve books Monson has written and published are the Enchanted Tunnels series of children's fiction books for children, and The Water is Wide (2010, Deseret Book), which concerned an ancestor who emigrated to Utah but did not join the Church of Jesus Christ of Latter-day Saints. In the "Enchanted Tunnels" children's books: Pioneer Puzzle, Escape From Egypt, Journey To Jerusalem, and Wandering In The Wilderness (all 2010 by Deseret Book); she uses the names of her two children (Nathan and Aria) for the protagonists' names. With Michelle Roehm McCann and David Hohn, Monson wrote Finding Fairies: Secrets for Attracting Little People from Around the World (2004, Whitecap Books, Limited), and edited the Girls Know Best series (1999, three volumes, Beyond Words Publishing).

Monson is best known for her women's history books, including nonfiction titles Frontier Grit: the Unlikely True Stories of Pioneer Women (2016) and Women of the Blue & Gray: Mothers, Medics, Soldiers, Spies of the Civil War (Shadow Mountain Press, 2018). Her historical fiction novel about the life of Martha Hughes Cannon, Her Quiet Revolution: A Novel of Martha Hughes Cannon, Frontier Doctor and First Female State Senator, was released in Spring 2020 in commemoration of the 100th anniversary of US women's suffrage. Monson's latest novel, The Opera Sisters, was published in September 2022.
