= Ellis Reynolds Shipp =

American physician

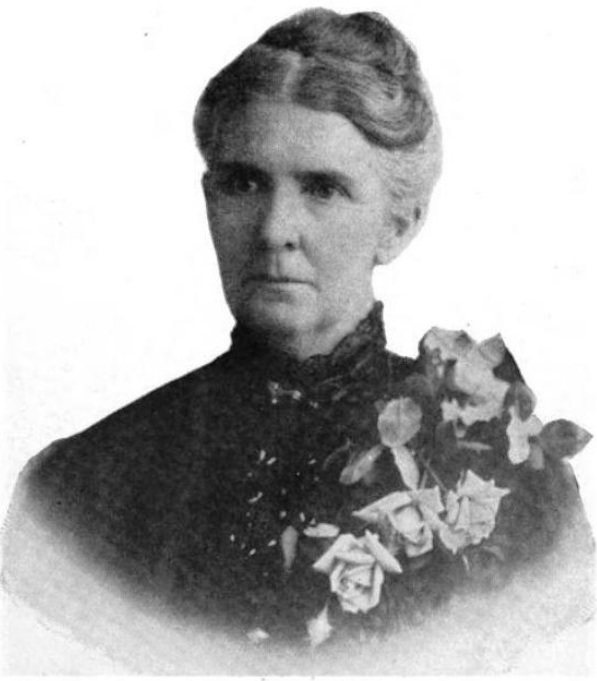
- Born: January 20, 1847; Davis County, Iowa
- Died: January 31, 1939 (aged 92); Salt Lake City, Utah
- Education: University of Deseret; Women's Medical College of Pennsylvania; University of Michigan
- Occupation: Physician

Ellis Reynolds Shipp MD (January 20, 1847 – January 31, 1939) was an American doctor and one of the first female doctors in Utah. She founded the School of Nursing and Obstetrics in 1879, and was on the board of the Deseret Hospital Association. In her 50-year medical career, she led the School of Nursing and Obstetrics to train more than 500 women as licensed midwives.

== Early life and education ==
Born Ellis Reynolds in Davis County, Iowa, she moved with her family to Utah Territory in 1852 after her parents were baptized into the Church of Jesus Christ of Latter-day Saints (LDS Church). Her family was among the early Mormon pioneer settlers of Pleasant Grove, Utah. Her mother died when she was fourteen years old, and her father remarried and relocated the family to Sanpete County. While living there, Ellis Reynolds was invited by Brigham Young to move to Salt Lake City and live in the Beehive House and go to school.

Shipp began studying at the University of Deseret, and later in Philadelphia at the Women's Medical College of Pennsylvania in 1875. She left her children behind in Utah Territory in the care of her husband's three other wives. Milford Shipp's second wife, Margaret C. Roberts, was originally sent to Women's Medical College but returned after a month due to homesickness, with Ellis Shipp replacing her. After her first year, she returned to Utah for the summer, eventually going back to Philadelphia pregnant with her sixth child. She graduated from the school in 1878 with honors. Brigham Young sponsored her education in the eastern United States, and she later did further medical studies at the University of Michigan in 1893.

== Career in obstetrics practice and teaching ==
When she returned to Utah, Ellis Shipp founded the Ellis Reynolds Shipp's School of Obstetrics and Nursing, which trained over 500 women in midwifery and nursing. Along with her established school, Shipp also traveled to settlements to teach women about health and nursing, at the request of the Relief Society. She delivered more than 5,000 children in her career.

In 1888, Ellis Shipp founded one of the first medical journals in Utah, called the Salt Lake Sanitarian, with Milford Shipp and Margaret Roberts. The three served as editors of the journal which was published for only three years.

== Service in LDS Church ==
Shipp served as a member of the General Board of the Relief Society, the women's organization for the LDS Church, from 1898 to 1907. She also served on the general board of the Young Women's Mutual Improvement Association. She also served with the Utah Women's Press Club as president and the National Council of Women as a delegate. Shipp spoke twice at the World's Congress of Representative Women. She first spoke of the success seen by the women of Utah in medicine. Her second talk, entitled "Medical Education of Women in Great Britain and Ireland" was in the final publication of the congress.

== Personal life ==
On May 5, 1866, Ellis Reynolds married Milford Shipp. She bore a total of ten children, six of whom survived infancy. Shipp combined motherhood and a medical practice, saying, "It is to me the crowning joy of a woman’s life to be a mother." In 1910, she published a book of her own poems, Life Lines.

Shipp died at age 92 in Salt Lake City on January 31, 1939, of cancer.

== Honors ==
In 2023 a statue of Shipp was dedicated at This Is the Place Heritage Park.

A neighborhood park in Salt Lake City, Utah, is named "Dr. Ellis Reynolds Shipp Park" in Shipp's honor; it is located near where she lived and practiced medicine. A public health center in West Valley, Utah, the Ellis Reynolds Shipp Public Health Center, is also named in her honor.

Shipp is honored by the Daughters of Utah Pioneers with a display room in the Pioneer Memorial Museum in Salt Lake City.

Ellis Reynolds Shipp Hall (Building 11) of the women's dormitories in the old Heritage Halls at Brigham Young University was named after Shipp.
