= History of nuclear fusion =

The history of nuclear fusion began early in the 20th century as an inquiry into how stars powered themselves and expanded to incorporate a broad inquiry into the nature of matter and energy, as potential applications expanded to include warfare, energy production and rocket propulsion.

== Early research ==
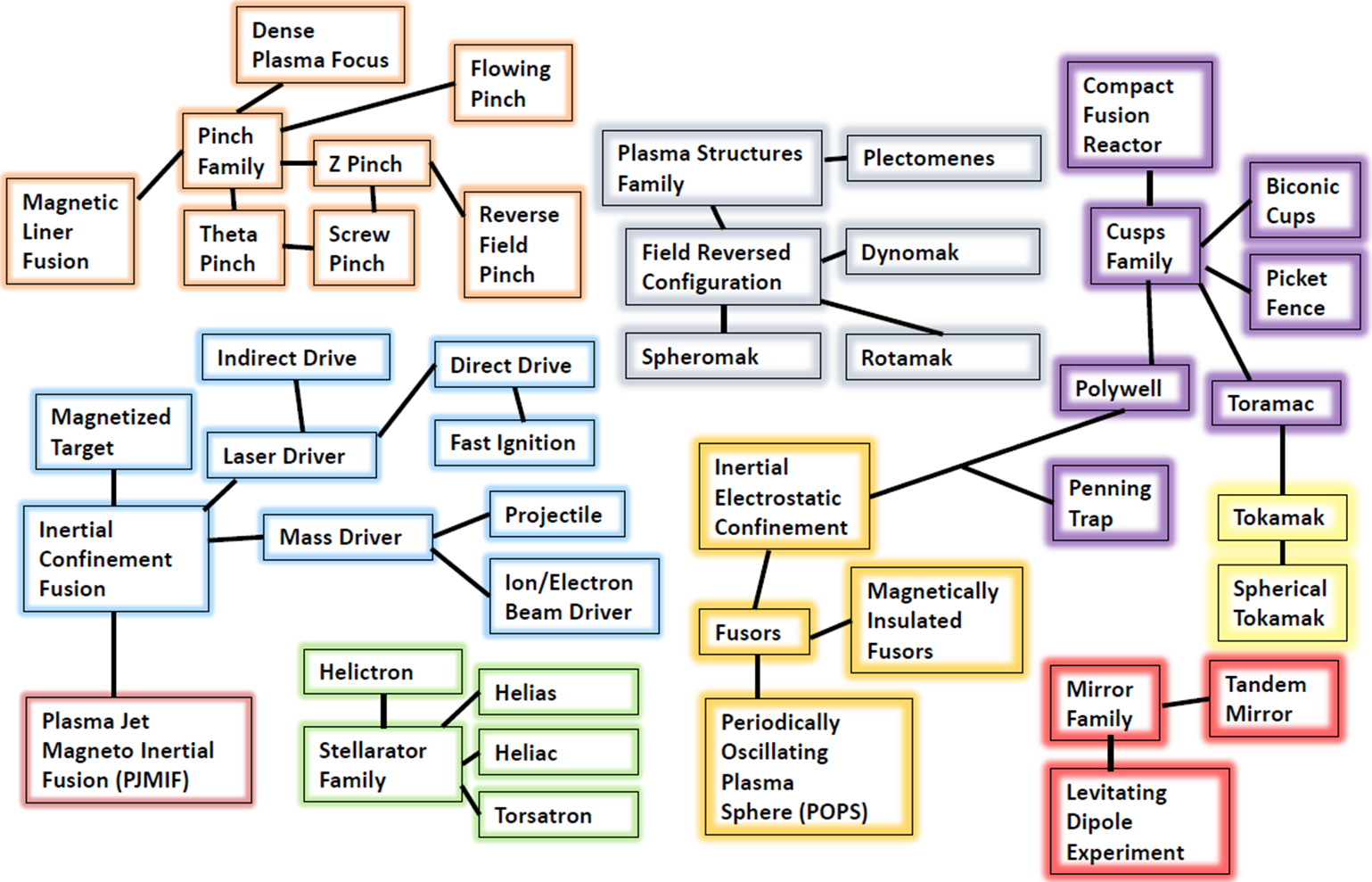
Various authors have also put forth ways to organize all the fusion approaches that have been tested over the past 70+ years. This flow chart above groups the approaches into color coded families, these are: the Pinch Family (orange), The Mirror Family (red), Cusp Systems (violet), Tokamaks & Stellarators (Green), Plasma Structures (gray), Inertial Electrostatic Confinement (dark yellow), Inertial Confinement Fusion (ICF, blue), Plasma Jet Magneto Inertial Fusion (PJMIF, dark pink).

In 1920, the British physicist, Francis William Aston, discovered that the mass of four hydrogen atoms is greater than the mass of one helium atom (He-4), which implied that energy can be released by combining hydrogen atoms to form helium. This provided the first hints of a mechanism by which stars could produce energy. Throughout the 1920s, Arthur Stanley Eddington became a major proponent of the proton–proton chain reaction (PP reaction) as the primary system running the Sun. Quantum tunneling was discovered by Friedrich Hund in 1929, and shortly afterwards Robert Atkinson and Fritz Houtermans used the measured masses of light elements to show that large amounts of energy could be released by fusing small nuclei.

Henry Norris Russell observed that the relationship in the Hertzsprung–Russell diagram suggested that a star's heat came from a hot core rather than from the entire star. Eddington used this to calculate that the temperature of the core would have to be about 40 million K. This became a matter of debate, because the value is much higher than astronomical observations that suggested about one-third to one-half that value. George Gamow introduced the mathematical basis for quantum tunnelling in 1928. In 1929, Robert d'Escourt Atkinson and Fritz Houtermans provided the first estimates of the stellar fusion rate. They showed that fusion can occur at lower energies than previously believed, backing Eddington's calculations.

Nuclear experiments began using a particle accelerator built by John Cockcroft and Ernest Walton at Ernest Rutherford's Cavendish Laboratory at the University of Cambridge. In 1932, Walton produced the first man-made fission by using protons from the accelerator to split lithium into alpha particles. The accelerator was then used to fire deuterons at various targets. Working with Rutherford and others, Mark Oliphant discovered the nuclei of helium-3 (helions) and tritium (tritons), the first case of human-caused fusion.

Neutrons from fusion were first detected in 1933. The experiment involved the acceleration of protons towards a target at energies of up to 600,000 electron volts. In August 1938, Arthur J. Ruhlig published an article in the Physical Review, in which he recorded observations on deuterium-tritium fusion. Although not well known or much cited, the paper inspired the Manhattan Project to investigate the process.

A theory verified by Hans Bethe in 1939 showed that beta decay and quantum tunneling in the Sun's core might convert one of the protons into a neutron and thereby produce deuterium rather than a diproton. The deuterium would then fuse through other reactions to further increase the energy output. For this work, Bethe won the 1967 Nobel Prize in Physics.

In 1938, Peter Thonemann developed a detailed plan for a pinch device, but was told to do other work for his thesis.

The first patent related to a fusion reactor was registered in 1946 by the United Kingdom Atomic Energy Authority. The inventors were Sir George Paget Thomson and Moses Blackman. This was the first detailed examination of the Z-pinch concept. Starting in 1947, two UK teams carried out experiments based on this concept.

== 1950s ==
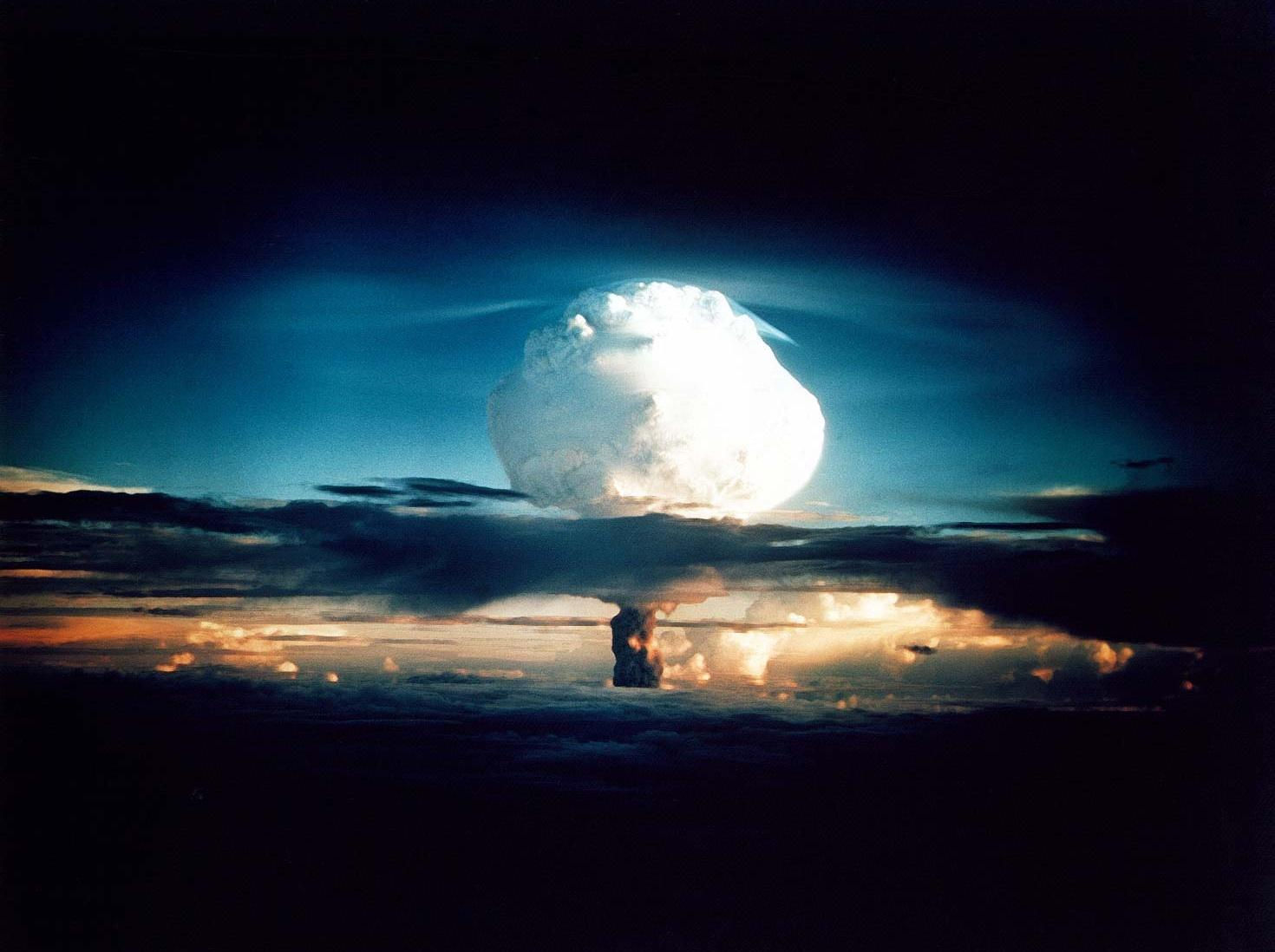
The first man-made device to achieve ignition was the detonation of this fusion device, codenamed Ivy Mike.

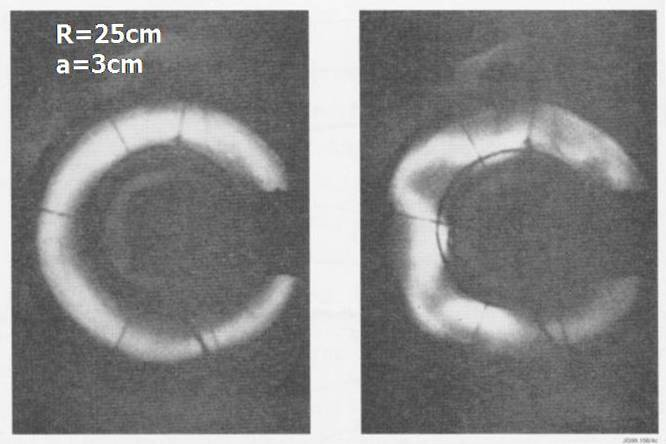
Early photo of plasma inside a pinch machine (Imperial College 1950/1951)

The first successful man-made fusion device was the boosted fission weapon tested in 1951 in the Greenhouse Item test. The first true fusion weapon was 1952's Ivy Mike, and the first practical example was 1954's Castle Bravo. In these devices, the energy released by a fission explosion compresses and heats the fuel, starting a fusion reaction. Fusion releases neutrons. These neutrons hit the surrounding fission fuel, causing the atoms to split apart much faster than normal fission processes. This increased the effectiveness of bombs: normal fission weapons blow themselves apart before all their fuel is used; fusion/fission weapons do not waste their fuel.

=== Stellarator ===
In 1949 expatriate German Ronald Richter proposed the Huemul Project in Argentina, announcing positive results in 1951. These turned out to be fake, but prompted others' interest. Lyman Spitzer began considering ways to solve problems involved in confining a hot plasma, and, unaware of the Z-pinch efforts, he created the stellarator. Spitzer applied to the US Atomic Energy Commission for funding to build a test device.

During this period, James L. Tuck, who had worked with the UK teams on Z-pinch, had been introducing the stellarator concept to his coworkers at LANL. When he heard of Spitzer's pitch, he applied to build a pinch machine of his own, the Perhapsatron.

Spitzer's idea won funding and he began work under Project Matterhorn. His work led to the creation of Princeton Plasma Physics Laboratory (PPPL). Tuck returned to LANL and arranged local funding to build his machine. By this time it was clear that the pinch machines were afflicted by instability, stalling progress. In 1953, Tuck and others suggested solutions that led to a second series of pinch machines, such as the ZETA and Sceptre devices.

Spitzer's first machine, 'A' worked, but his next one, 'B', suffered from instabilities and plasma leakage.

In 1954 AEC chair Lewis Strauss foresaw electricity as "too cheap to meter". Strauss was likely referring to fusion power, part of the secret Project Sherwood—but his statement was interpreted as referring to fission. The AEC had issued more realistic testimony regarding fission to Congress months before, projecting that "costs can be brought down... [to]... about the same as the cost of electricity from conventional sources..."

=== Edward Teller ===
In 1951 Edward Teller and Stanislaw Ulam at Los Alamos National Laboratory (LANL) developed the Teller-Ulam design for a thermonuclear weapon, allowing for the development of multi-megaton yield fusion bombs. Fusion work in the UK was classified after the Klaus Fuchs affair.

In the mid-1950s the theoretical tools used to calculate the performance of fusion machines were not predicting their actual behavior. Machines invariably leaked plasma at rates far higher than predicted. In 1954, Edward Teller gathered fusion researchers at the Princeton Gun Club. He pointed out the problems and suggested that any system that confined plasma within concave fields was doomed due to what became known as interchange instability. Attendees remember him saying in effect that the fields were like rubber bands, and they would attempt to snap back to a straight configuration whenever the power was increased, ejecting the plasma. He suggested that the only way to predictably confine plasma would be to use convex fields: a "cusp" configuration.^{:118}

When the meeting concluded, most researchers turned out papers explaining why Teller's concerns did not apply to their devices. Pinch machines did not use magnetic fields in this way, while the mirror and stellarator claques proposed various solutions. This was soon followed by Martin David Kruskal and Martin Schwarzschild's paper discussing pinch machines, however, which demonstrated those devices' instabilities were inherent.^{:118}

=== ZETA ===
The largest "classic" pinch device was the ZETA, which started operation in the UK in 1957. Its name is a take-off on small experimental fission reactors that often had "zero energy" in their name, such as ZEEP.

In early 1958, John Cockcroft announced that fusion had been achieved in the ZETA, an announcement that made headlines around the world. He dismissed US physicists' concerns. US experiments soon produced similar neutrons, although temperature measurements suggested these could not be from fusion. The ZETA neutrons were later demonstrated to be from different versions of the instability processes that had plagued earlier machines. Cockcroft was forced to retract his fusion claims, tainting the entire field for years. ZETA ended in 1968.

=== Scylla ===
The first experiment to achieve controlled thermonuclear fusion was accomplished using Scylla I at LANL in 1958. Scylla I was a θ-pinch machine, with a cylinder full of deuterium. Electric current shot down the sides of the cylinder. The current made magnetic fields that pinched the plasma, raising temperatures to 15 million degrees Celsius, for long enough that atoms fused and produced neutrons. The Sherwood program sponsored a series of Scylla machines at Los Alamos. The program began with 5 researchers and $100,000 in US funding in January 1952. By 1965, a total of $21 million had been spent. The θ-pinch approach was abandoned after calculations showed it could not scale up to produce a reactor.

=== Tokamak ===
In 1950–1951 in the Soviet Union, Igor Tamm and Andrei Sakharov first discussed a tokamak-like approach. Experimental research on those designs began in 1956 at the Moscow Kurchatov Institute by a group of Soviet scientists led by Lev Artsimovich. The tokamak essentially combined a low-power pinch device with a low-power stellarator. The notion was to combine the fields in such a way that the particles orbited within the reactor a particular number of times, today known as the "safety factor". The combination of these fields dramatically improved confinement times and densities, resulting in huge improvements over existing devices.

=== Other ===
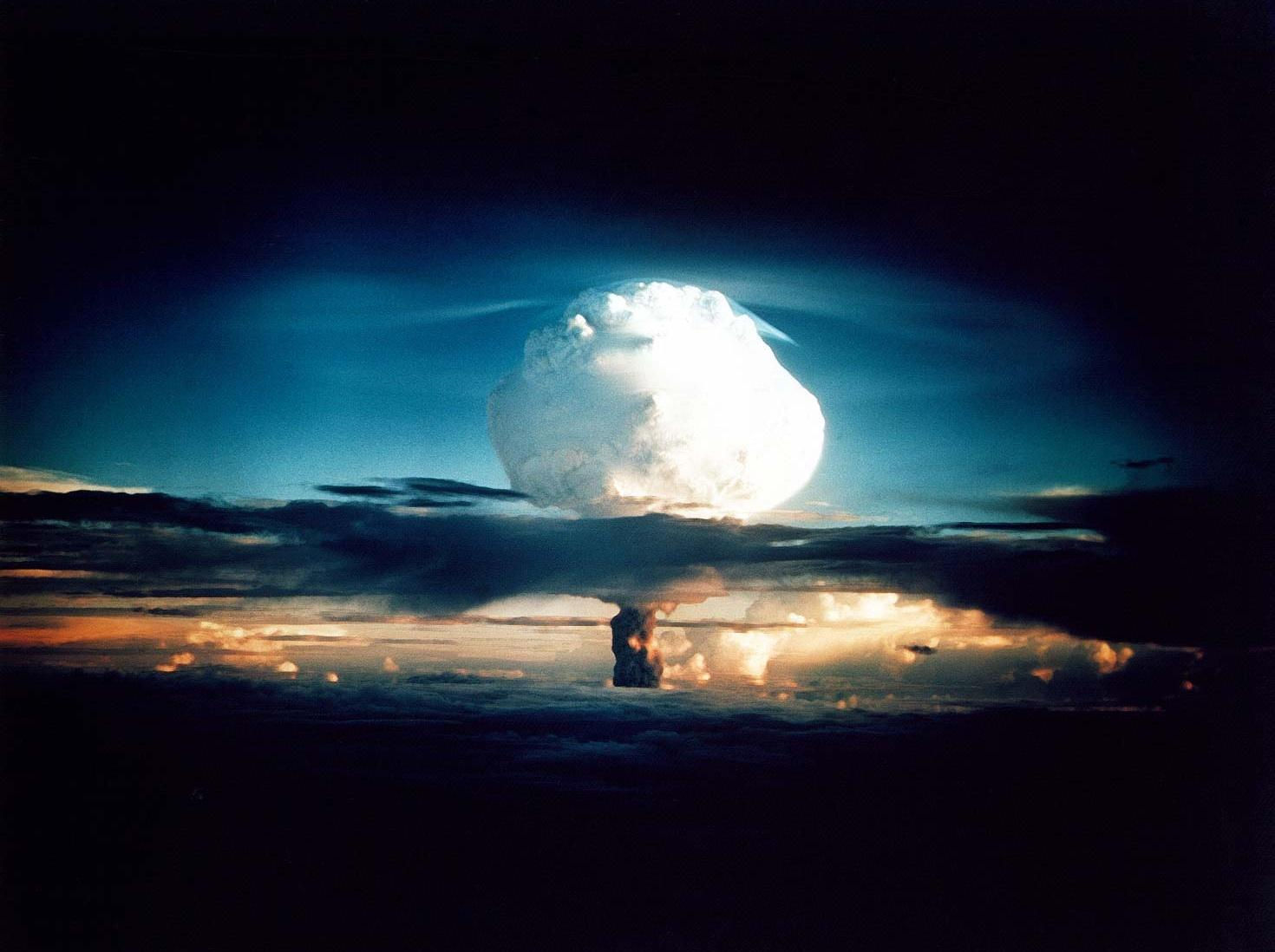
Ivy Mike, the first thermonuclear weapon, in 1952

In 1951, the United States completed the Greenhouse Item test of the first boosted fission weapon. A deuterium–tritium gas was used to enhance the fission yield. This became the first instance of artificial thermonuclear fusion, and the first weaponization of fusion. In 1952 Ivy Mike, part of Operation Ivy, became the first detonation of a hydrogen bomb, yielding 10.4 megatons of TNT using liquid deuterium. Cousins and Ware built a toroidal pinch device in England and demonstrated that the plasma in pinch devices is inherently unstable. In 1953 The Soviet Union tested its RDS-6S test, (codenamed "Joe 4" in the US) demonstrated a fission/fusion/fission ("Layercake") design that yielded 600 kilotons. Igor Kurchatov spoke at Harwell on pinch devices, revealing that the USSR was working on fusion.

Seeking to generate electricity, Japan, France and Sweden all start fusion research programs

In 1955, John D. Lawson (scientist) creates what is now known as the Lawson criterion which is a criterion for a fusion reactor to produce more energy than is lost to the environment due to problems like Bremsstrahlung radiation.

In 1956 the Soviet Union began publishing articles on plasma physics, leading the US and UK to follow over the next several years.

The Sceptre III z-pinch plasma column remained stable for 300 to 400 microseconds, a dramatic improvement on previous efforts. The team calculated that the plasma had an electrical resistivity around 100 times that of copper, and was able to carry 200 kA of current for 500 microseconds.

== 1960s ==
In 1960 John Nuckolls published the concept of inertial confinement fusion (ICF). The laser, introduced the same year, turned out to be a suitable "driver".

In 1961 the Soviet Union tested its 50 megaton Tsar Bomba, the most powerful thermonuclear weapon ever.

Spitzer published a key plasma physics text at Princeton in 1963. He took the ideal gas laws and adapted them to an ionized plasma, developing many of the fundamental equations used to model a plasma.

Laser fusion was suggested in 1962 by scientists at LLNL. Initially, lasers had little power. Laser fusion (inertial confinement fusion) research began as early as 1965.

At the 1964 World's Fair, the public was given its first fusion demonstration. The device was a Theta-pinch from General Electric. This was similar to the Scylla machine developed earlier at Los Alamos.

By the mid-1960s progress had stalled across the world. All of the major designs were losing plasma at unsustainable rates. The 12-beam "4 pi laser" attempt at inertial confinement fusion developed at LLNL targeted a gas-filled target chamber of about 20 centimeters in diameter.

The magnetic mirror was first published in 1967 by Richard F. Post and many others at LLNL. The mirror consisted of two large magnets arranged so they had strong fields within them, and a weaker, but connected, field between them. Plasma introduced in the area between the two magnets would "bounce back" from the stronger fields in the middle.

A.D. Sakharov's group constructed the first tokamaks. The most successful were the T-3 and its larger version T-4. T-4 was tested in 1968 in Novosibirsk, producing the first quasistationary fusion reaction.^{:90} When this was announced, the international community was skeptical. A British team was invited to see T-3, and confirmed the Soviet claims. A burst of activity followed as many planned devices were abandoned and tokamaks were introduced in their place—the C model stellarator, then under construction after many redesigns, was quickly converted to the Symmetrical Tokamak.

In his work with vacuum tubes, Philo Farnsworth observed that electric charge accumulated in the tube. In 1962, Farnsworth patented a design using a positive inner cage to concentrate plasma and fuse protons. During this time, Robert L. Hirsch joined Farnsworth Television labs and began work on what became the Farnsworth-Hirsch Fusor. This effect became known as the Multipactor effect. Hirsch patented the design in 1966 and published it in 1967.

Plasma temperatures of approximately 40 million degrees Celsius and 10^{9} deuteron-deuteron fusion reactions per discharge were achieved at LANL with Scylla IV.

In 1968 the Soviets announced results from the T-3 tokamak, claiming temperatures an order of magnitude higher than any other device. A UK team, nicknamed "The Culham Five", confirmed the results. The results led many other teams, including the Princeton group, which converted their stellarator to a tokamak.

== 1970s ==
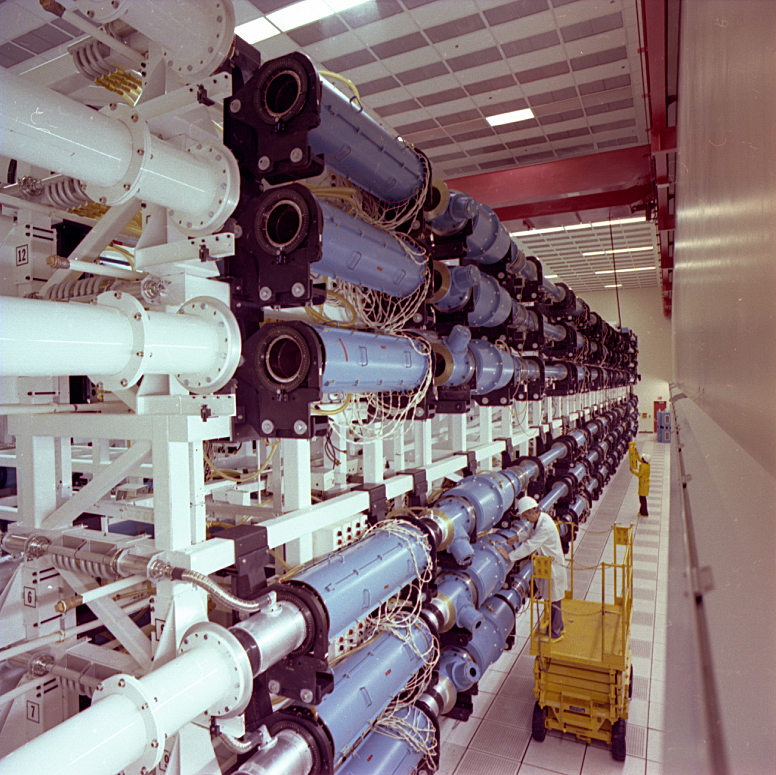
Shiva laser, 1977, the largest ICF laser system built in the seventies

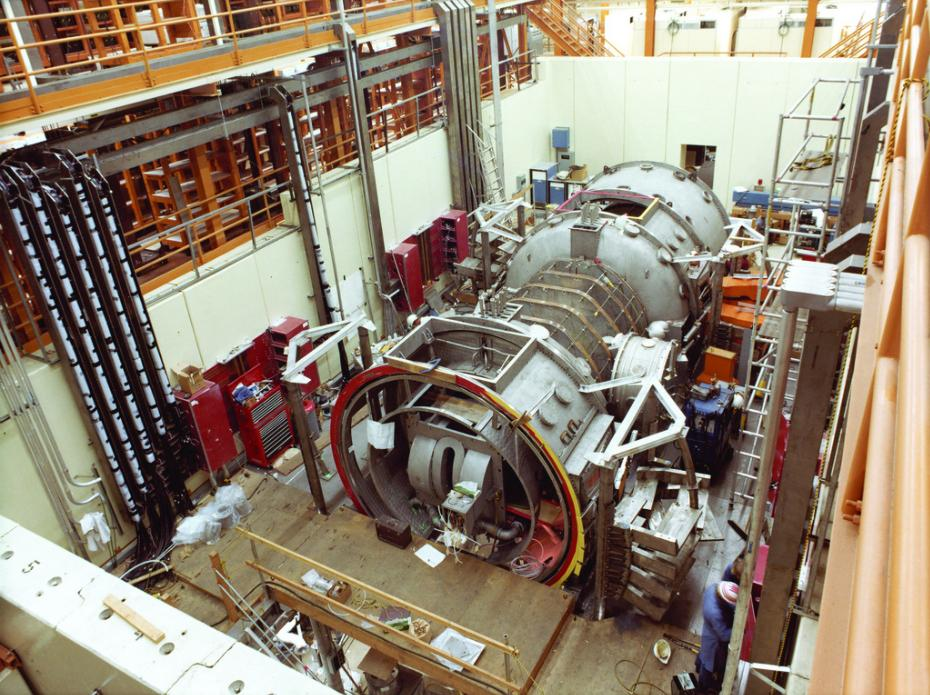
The Tandem Mirror Experiment (TMX) in 1979

Princeton's conversion of the Model C stellarator to a tokamak produced results matching the Soviets. With an apparent solution to the magnetic bottle problem in-hand, plans begin for a larger machine to test scaling and methods to heat the plasma.

In 1972, John Nuckolls outlined the idea of fusion ignition, a fusion chain reaction. Hot helium made during fusion reheats the fuel and starts more reactions. Nuckolls's paper started a major development effort. LLNL built laser systems including Argus, Cyclops, Janus, the neodymium-doped glass (Nd:glass) laser Long Path, Shiva laser, and the 10 beam Nova in 1984. Nova would ultimately produce 120 kilojoules of infrared light during a nanosecond pulse.

The UK built the Central Laser Facility in 1976.

The "advanced tokamak" concept emerged, which included non-circular plasma, internal diverters and limiters, superconducting magnets, and operation in the so-called "H-mode" island of increased stability. Two other designs became prominent; the compact tokamak sited the magnets on the inside of the vacuum chamber, and the spherical tokamak with as small a cross section as possible.

In 1974 J.B. Taylor re-visited ZETA and noticed that after an experimental run ended, the plasma entered a short period of stability. This led to the reversed field pinch concept. On May 1, 1974, the KMS fusion company (founded by Kip Siegel) achieved the world's first laser induced fusion in a deuterium-tritium pellet.

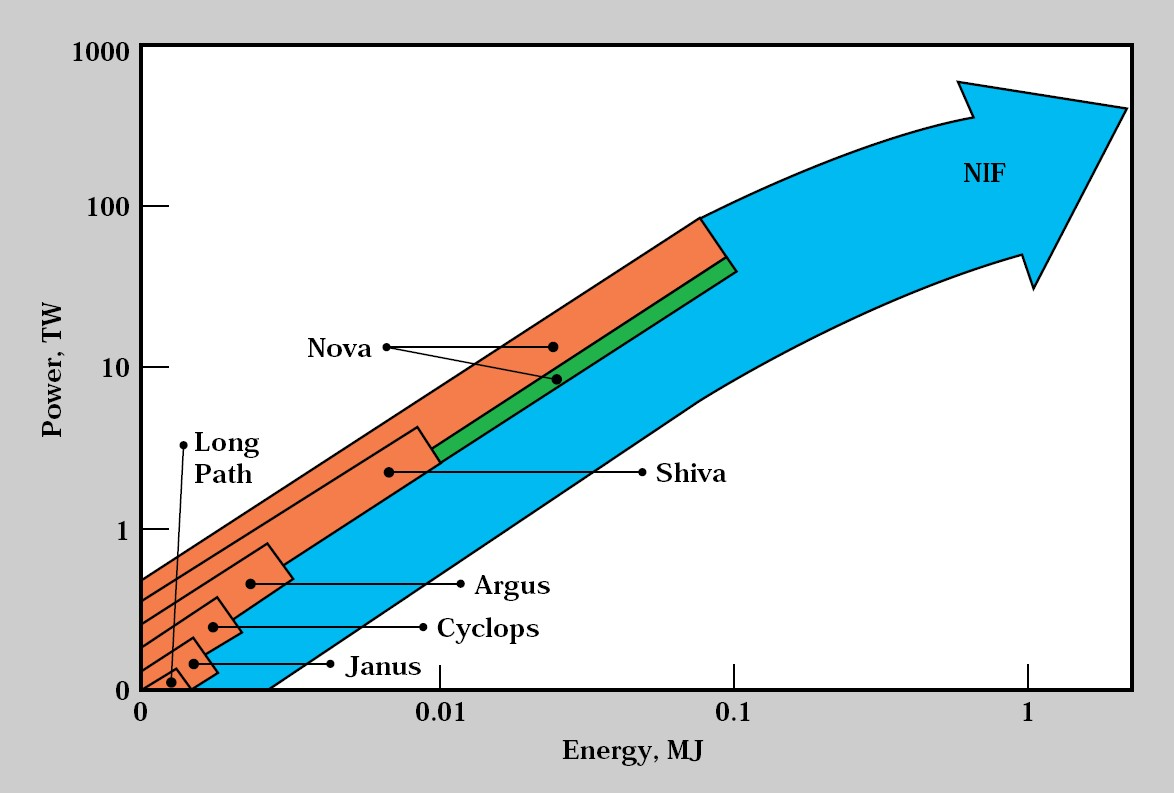
Progress in power and energy levels attainable by inertial confinement lasers has increased dramatically since the early 1970s.

The Princeton Large Torus (PLT), the follow-on to the Symmetrical Tokamak, surpassed the best Soviet machines and set temperature records that were above what was needed for a commercial reactor. Soon after it received funding with the target of breakeven.

In the mid-1970s, Project PACER, carried out at LANL explored the possibility of exploding small hydrogen bombs (fusion bombs) inside an underground cavity.^{:25} As an energy source, the system was the only system that could work using the technology of the time. It required a large, continuous supply of nuclear bombs, however, with questionable economics.

In 1976, the two beam Argus laser became operational at LLNL. In 1977, the 20 beam Shiva laser there was completed, capable of delivering 10.2 kilojoules of infrared energy on target. At a price of $25 million and a size approaching that of a football field, Shiva was the first megalaser.

At a 1977 workshop at the Claremont Hotel in Berkeley Dr. C. Martin Stickley, then Director of the Energy Research and Development Agency 's Office of Inertial Fusion, claimed that "no showstoppers" lay on the road to fusion energy.

The DOE selected a Princeton design Tokamak Fusion Test Reactor (TFTR) and the challenge of running on deuterium-tritium fuel.

The 20 beam Shiva laser at LLNL became capable of delivering 10.2 kilojoules of infrared energy on target. Costing $25 million and nearly covering a football field, Shiva was the first "megalaser" at LLNL.

== 1980s ==
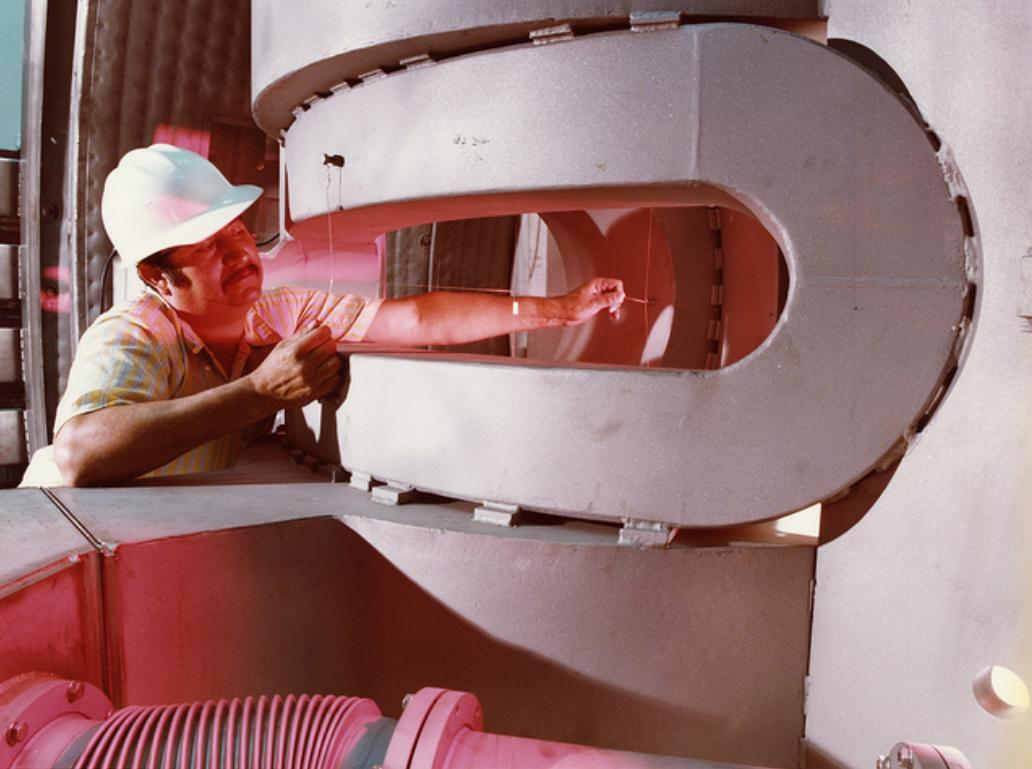
Magnetic mirrors suffered from end losses, requiring high power, complex magnetic designs, such as the baseball coil pictured here.

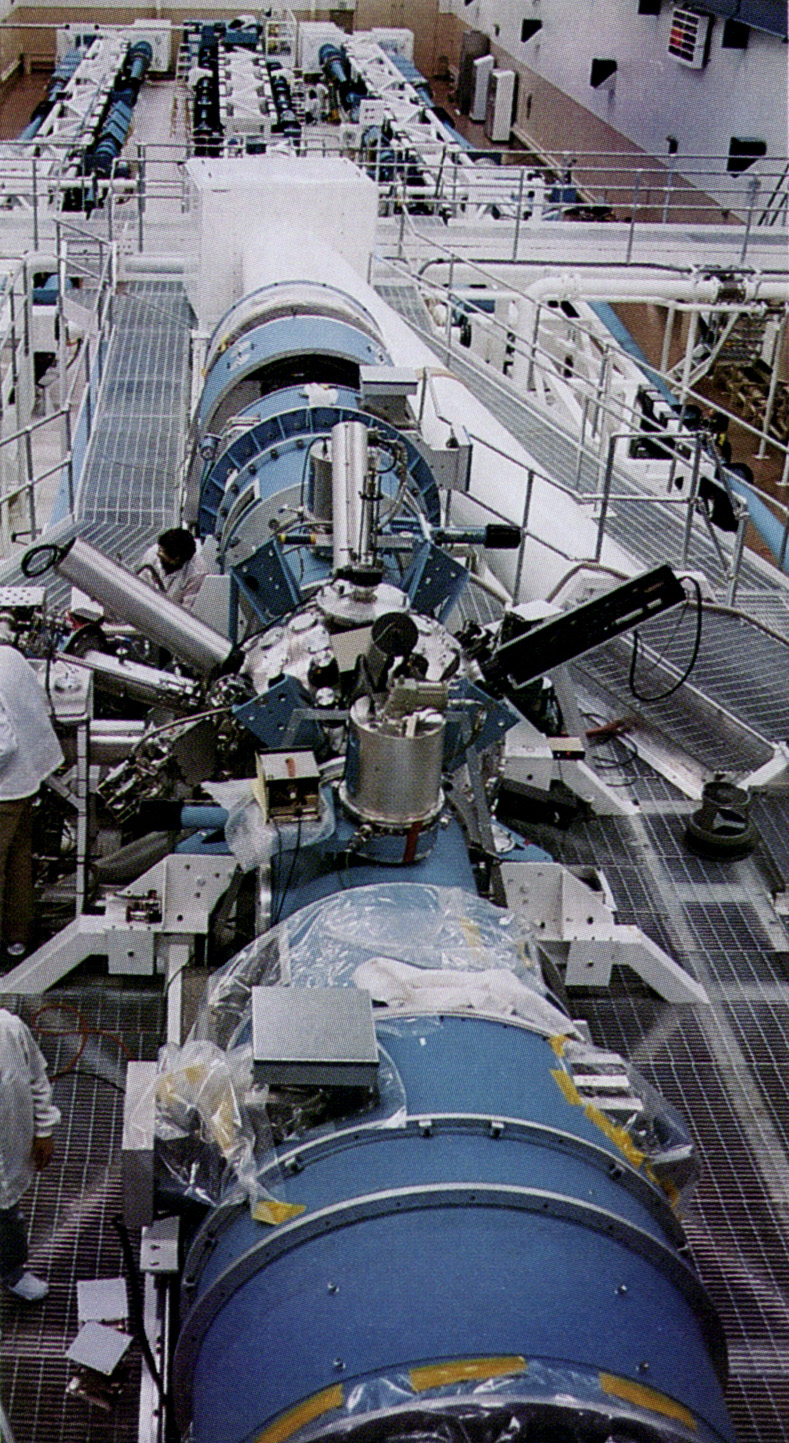
The Novette target chamber (metal sphere with diagnostic devices protruding radially), which was reused from the Shiva project and two newly built laser chains visible in background.

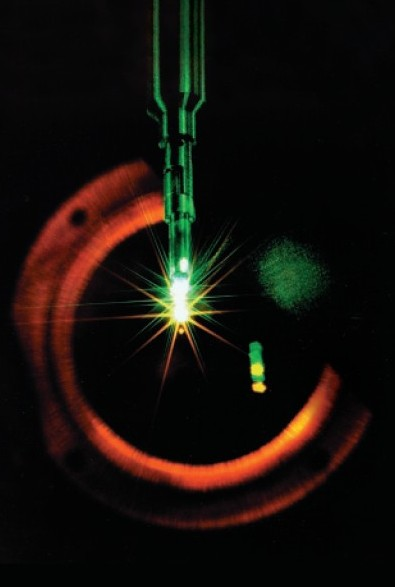
Inertial confinement fusion implosion on the Nova laser during the 1980s was a key driver of fusion development.

In the German/US HIBALL study, Garching used the high repetition rate of the RF driver to serve four reactor chambers using liquid lithium inside the chamber cavity. In 1982 high-confinement mode (H-mode) was discovered in ASDEX.

=== Magnetic mirror ===
The US funded a magnetic mirror program in the late 1970s and early 1980s. This program resulted in a series of magnetic mirror devices including: 2X,^{:273} Baseball I, Baseball II, the Tandem Mirror Experiment and upgrade, the Mirror Fusion Test Facility, and MFTF-B. These machines were built and tested at LLNL from the late 1960s to the mid-1980s. The final machine, MFTF cost 372 million dollars and was, at that time, the most expensive project in LLNL history. It opened on February 21, 1986, and immediately closed, allegedly to balance the federal budget.

=== Laser ===
Laser fusion progress: in 1983, the NOVETTE laser was completed. The following December, the ten-beam NOVA laser was finished. Five years later, NOVA produced 120 kilojoules of infrared light during a nanosecond pulse.

Research focused on either fast delivery or beam smoothness. Both focused on increasing energy uniformity. One early problem was that the light in the infrared wavelength lost energy before hitting the fuel. Breakthroughs were made at LLE at University of Rochester. Rochester scientists used frequency-tripling crystals to transform infrared laser beams into ultraviolet beams.

==== Chirped-pulse amplification laser technique ====
In 1985, Donna Strickland and Gérard Mourou invented a method to amplify ultra-short laser pulses by frequency "chirping" them before amplification. This approach rearranges the frequency content of a picosecond or shorter pulse by group-velocity dispersion (GVD), creating a pulse stretched in time by a factor of 1,000 or more, and reducing peak intensity by the same factor. This much less intense, longer duration, pulse can then be safely amplified to an intensity approaching the practical limit of the laser (such as the optical damage threshold). After amplification the pulse is recompressed to near-original duration, using an optical system having the opposite sign of group-velocity dispersion. This recompression in time of 1,000 or more means a jump in intensity of the same factor, producing a pulse orders of magnitude more intense than could have been produced by direct laser amplification. Chirp pulsed amplification rapidly became a transformative contribution for research in high-intensity laser-matter interaction physics, using laser systems like ELI Beamlines, Omega EP, and many others worldwide, as well as for the ‘fast ignition’ concept of laser fusion in which fuel compression and fuel heating become partially separated processes.

LANL constructed a series of laser facilities. They included Gemini (a two beam system), Helios (eight beams), Antares (24 beams) and Aurora (96 beams). The program ended in the early nineties with a cost on the order of one billion dollars.

In 1987, Akira Hasegawa noticed that in a dipolar magnetic field, fluctuations tended to compress the plasma without energy loss. This effect was noticed in data taken by Voyager 2, when it encountered Uranus. This observation became the basis for a fusion approach known as the levitated dipole.

In tokamaks, the Tore Supra was under construction from 1983 to 1988 in Cadarache, France. Its superconducting magnets permitted it to generate a strong permanent toroidal magnetic field. First plasma came in 1988.

In 1983, JET achieved first plasma. In 1985, the Japanese tokamak, JT-60 produced its first plasmas. In 1988, the T-15 a Soviet tokamak was completed, the first to use (helium-cooled) superconducting magnets.

In 1998, the T-15 Soviet tokamak with superconducting helium-cooled coils was completed.

=== Spherical tokamak ===
In 1984, Martin Peng proposed an alternate arrangement of magnet coils that would greatly reduce the aspect ratio while avoiding the erosion issues of the compact tokamak: a spherical tokamak. Instead of wiring each magnet coil separately, he proposed using a single large conductor in the center, and wiring the magnets as half-rings off of this conductor. What was once a series of individual rings passing through the hole in the center of the reactor was reduced to a single post, allowing for aspect ratios as low as 1.2.^{:B247}^{:225} The ST concept appeared to represent an enormous advance in tokamak design. The proposal came during a period when US fusion research budgets were dramatically smaller. ORNL was provided with funds to develop a suitable central column built out of a high-strength copper alloy called "Glidcop". However, they were unable to secure funding to build a demonstration machine.

Failing at ORNL, Peng began a worldwide effort to interest other teams in the concept and get a test machine built. One approach would be to convert a spheromak.^{:225} Peng's advocacy caught the interest of Derek Robinson, of the United Kingdom Atomic Energy Authority. Robinson gathered a team and secured on the order of 100,000 pounds to build an experimental machine, the Small Tight Aspect Ratio Tokamak, or START. Parts of the machine were recycled from earlier projects, while others were loaned from other labs, including a 40 keV neutral beam injector from ORNL. Construction began in 1990 and operation started in January 1991.^{:11} It achieved a record beta (plasma pressure compared to magnetic field pressure) of 40% using a neutral beam injector

=== ITER ===
The International Thermonuclear Experimental Reactor (ITER) coalition forms, involving EURATOM, Japan, the Soviet Union and United States and kicks off the conceptual design process.

== 1990s ==
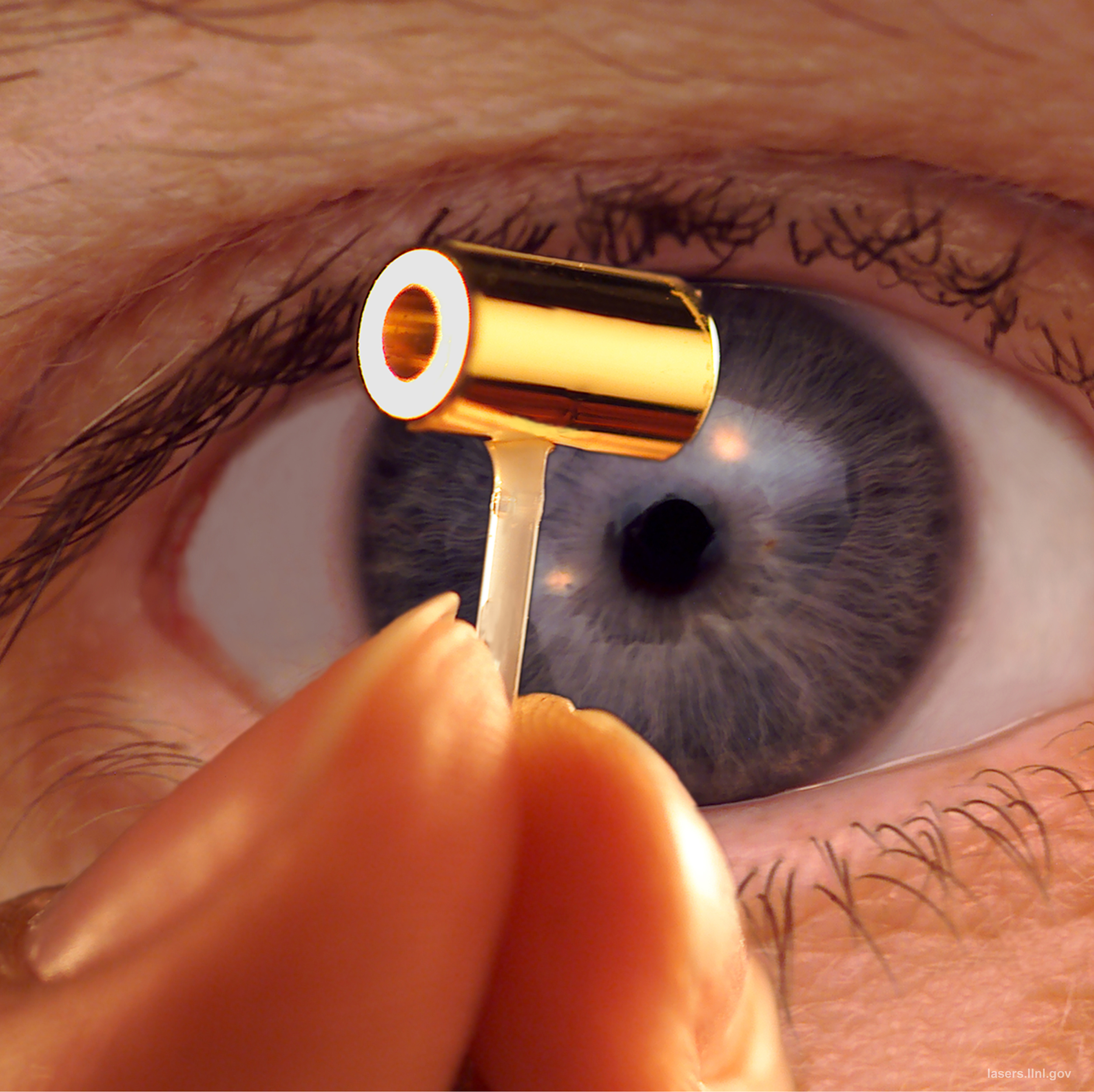
Mockup of a gold-plated hohlraum designed for use in the National Ignition Facility

In 1991 JET's Preliminary Tritium Experiment achieved the world's first controlled release of fusion power.

In 1992, Physics Today published Robert McCory's outline of the current state of ICF, advocating for a national ignition facility. This was followed by a review article from John Lindl in 1995, making the same point. During this time various ICF subsystems were developed, including target manufacturing, cryogenic handling systems, new laser designs (notably the NIKE laser at NRL) and improved diagnostics including time of flight analyzers and Thomson scattering. This work was done at the NOVA laser system, General Atomics, Laser Mégajoule and the GEKKO XII system in Japan. Through this work and lobbying by groups like the fusion power associates and John Sethian at NRL, Congress authorized funding for the NIF project in the late nineties.

In 1992 the United States and the former republics of the Soviet Union stopped testing nuclear weapons.

In 1993 TFTR at PPPL experimented with 50% deuterium, 50% tritium, eventually reaching 10 megawatts.

In the early nineties, theory and experimental work regarding fusors and polywells was published. In response, Todd Rider at MIT developed general models of these devices, arguing that all plasma systems at thermodynamic equilibrium were fundamentally limited. In 1995, William Nevins published a criticism arguing that the particles inside fusors and polywells would acquire angular momentum, causing the dense core to degrade.

In 1995, the University of Wisconsin–Madison built a large fusor, known as HOMER. Dr George H. Miley at Illinois built a small fusor that produced neutrons using deuterium and discovered the "star mode" of fusor operation. At this time in Europe, an IEC device was developed as a commercial neutron source by Daimler-Chrysler and NSD Fusion.

The next year, Tore Supra reached a record plasma duration of two minutes with a current of almost 1 M amperes driven non-inductively by 2.3 MW of lower hybrid frequency waves (i.e. 280 MJ of injected and extracted energy), enabled by actively cooled plasma-facing components.

The upgraded Z-machine opened to the public in August 1998. The key attributes were its 18 million ampere current and a discharge time of less than 100 nanoseconds. This generated a magnetic pulse inside a large oil tank, which struck a liner (an array of tungsten wires). Firing the Z-machine became a way to test high energy, high temperature (2 billion degrees) conditions. In 1996.

In 1997, JET reached 16.1 MW (65% of heat to plasma), sustaining over 10 MW for over 0.5 sec. As of 2020 this remained the record output level. Four megawatts of alpha particle self-heating was achieved.

ITER was officially announced as part of a seven-party consortium (six countries and the EU). ITER was designed to produce ten times more fusion power than the input power. ITER was sited in Cadarache. The US withdrew from the project in 1999.

JT-60 produced a reversed shear plasma with the equivalent fusion amplification factor $Q_{eq}$ of 1.25 - as of 2021 this remained the world record.

In the late nineties, a team at Columbia University and MIT developed the levitated dipole, a fusion device that consisted of a superconducting electromagnet, floating in a saucer shaped vacuum chamber. Plasma swirled around this donut and fused along the center axis.

In 1999 MAST replaced START.

== 2000s ==
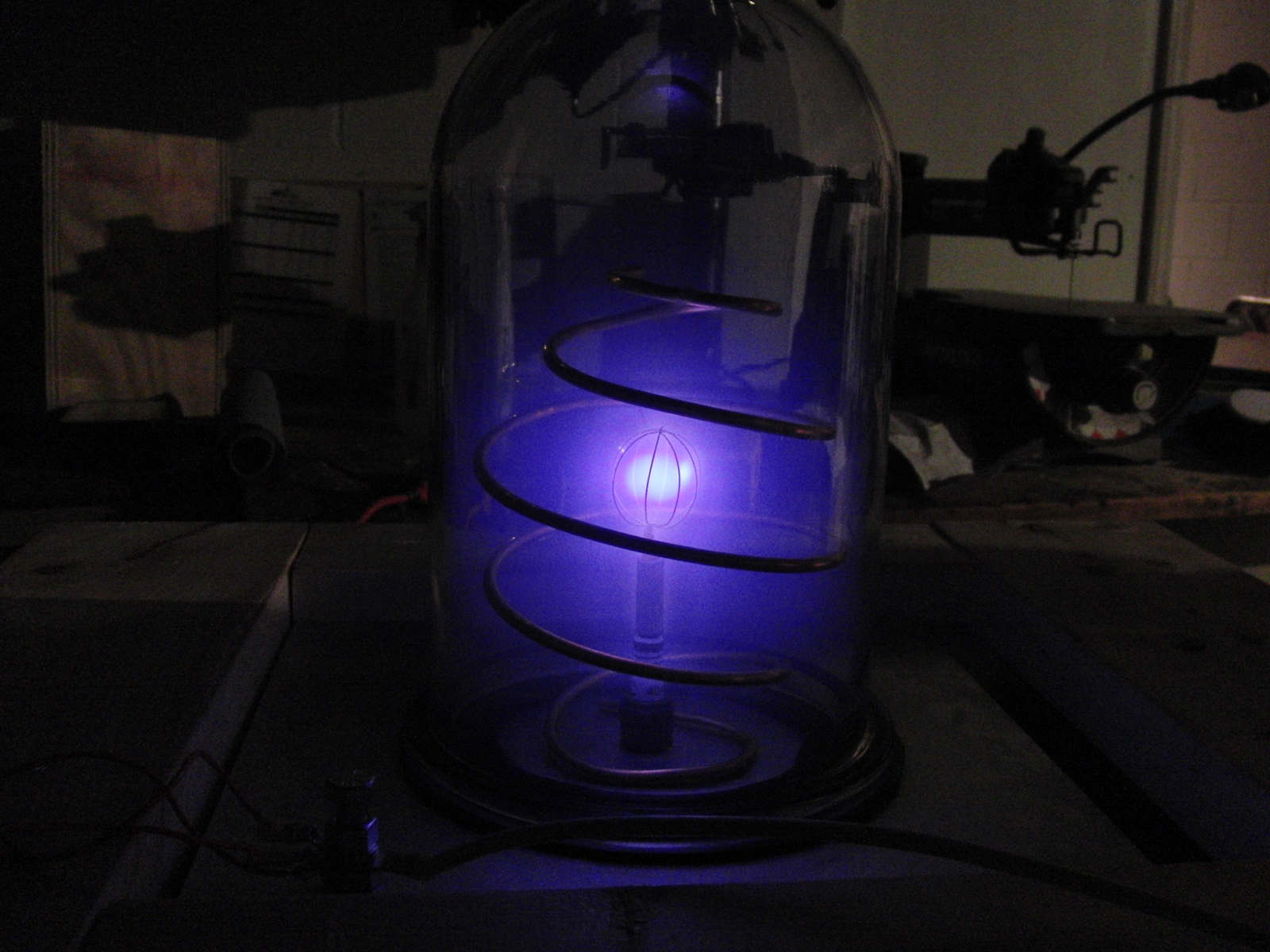
Starting in 1999, a growing number of amateurs have been able to fuse atoms using homemade fusors, shown here.

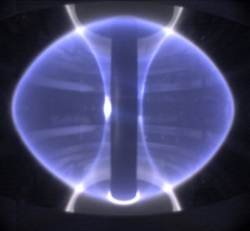
The Mega Ampere Spherical Tokamak became operational in the UK in 1999

"Fast ignition" appeared in the late nineties, as part of a push by LLE to build the Omega EP system, which finished in 2008. Fast ignition showed dramatic power savings and moved ICF into the race for energy production. The HiPER experimental facility became dedicated to fast ignition.

In 2001 the United States, China and Republic of Korea joined ITER while Canada withdrew.

In April 2005, a UCLA team announced a way of producing fusion using a machine that "fits on a lab bench", using lithium tantalate to generate enough voltage to fuse deuterium. The process did not generate net power.

The next year, China's EAST test reactor was completed. This was the first tokamak to use superconducting magnets to generate both toroidal and poloidal fields.

In the early 2000s, LANL researchers claimed that an oscillating plasma could reach local thermodynamic equilibrium. This prompted the POPS and Penning trap designs.

In 2005 NIF fired its first bundle of eight beams, achieving the most powerful laser pulse to date - 152.8 kJ (infrared).

MIT researchers became interested in fusors for space propulsion, using fusors with multiple inner cages. Greg Piefer founded Phoenix Nuclear Labs and developed the fusor into a neutron source for medical isotope production. Robert Bussard began speaking openly about the polywell in 2006.

In March 2009, NIF became operational.

In the early 2000s privately backed fusion companies launched to develop commercial fusion power. Tri Alpha Energy, founded in 1998, began by exploring a field-reversed configuration approach. In 2002, Canadian company General Fusion began proof-of-concept experiments based on a hybrid magneto-inertial approach called Magnetized Target Fusion. Investors included Jeff Bezos (General Fusion) and Paul Allen (Tri Alpha Energy). Toward the end of the decade, Tokamak Energy started exploring spherical tokamak devices using reconnection.

== 2010s ==
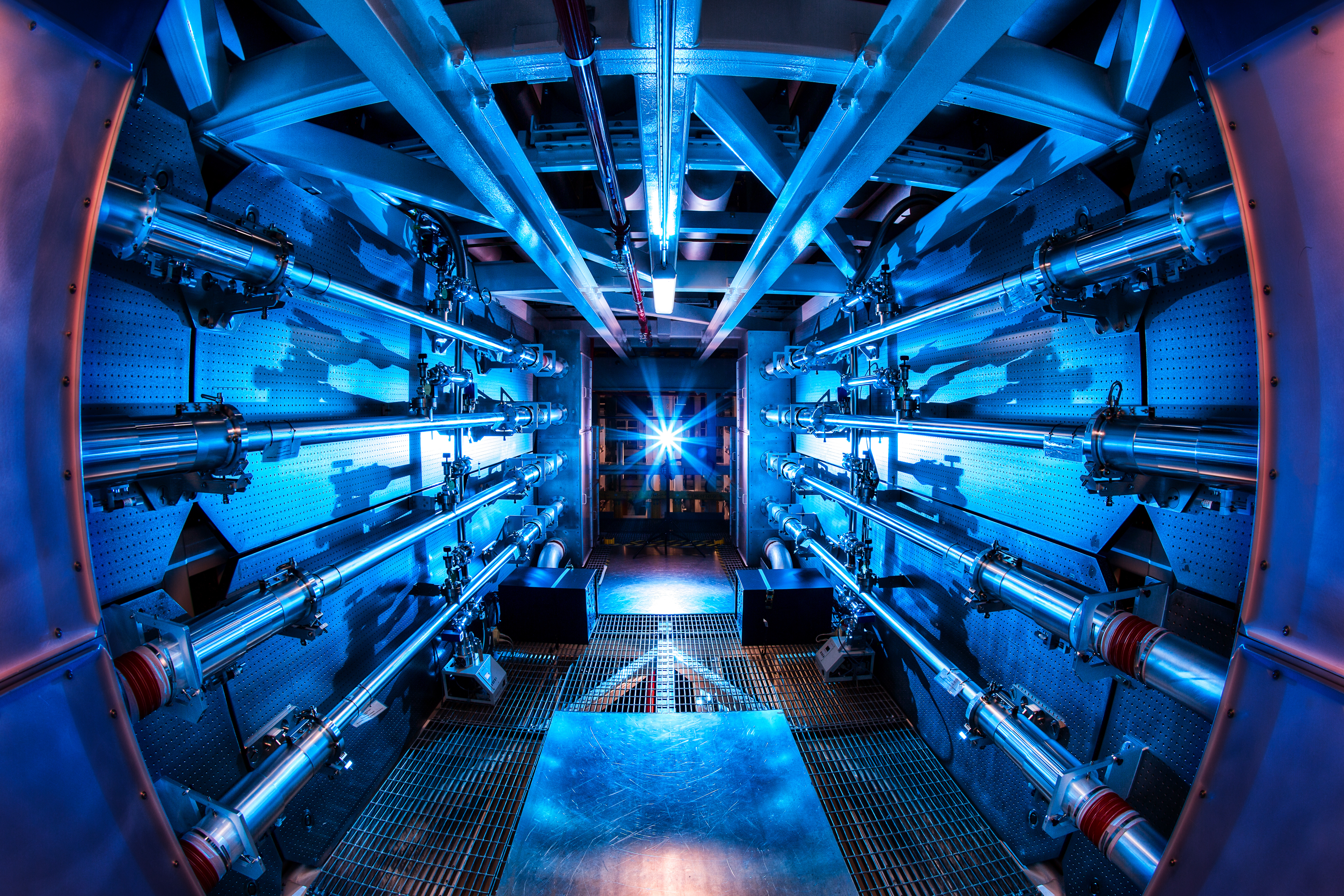
The preamplifiers of the National Ignition Facility. In 2012, the NIF achieved a 500-terawatt shot.

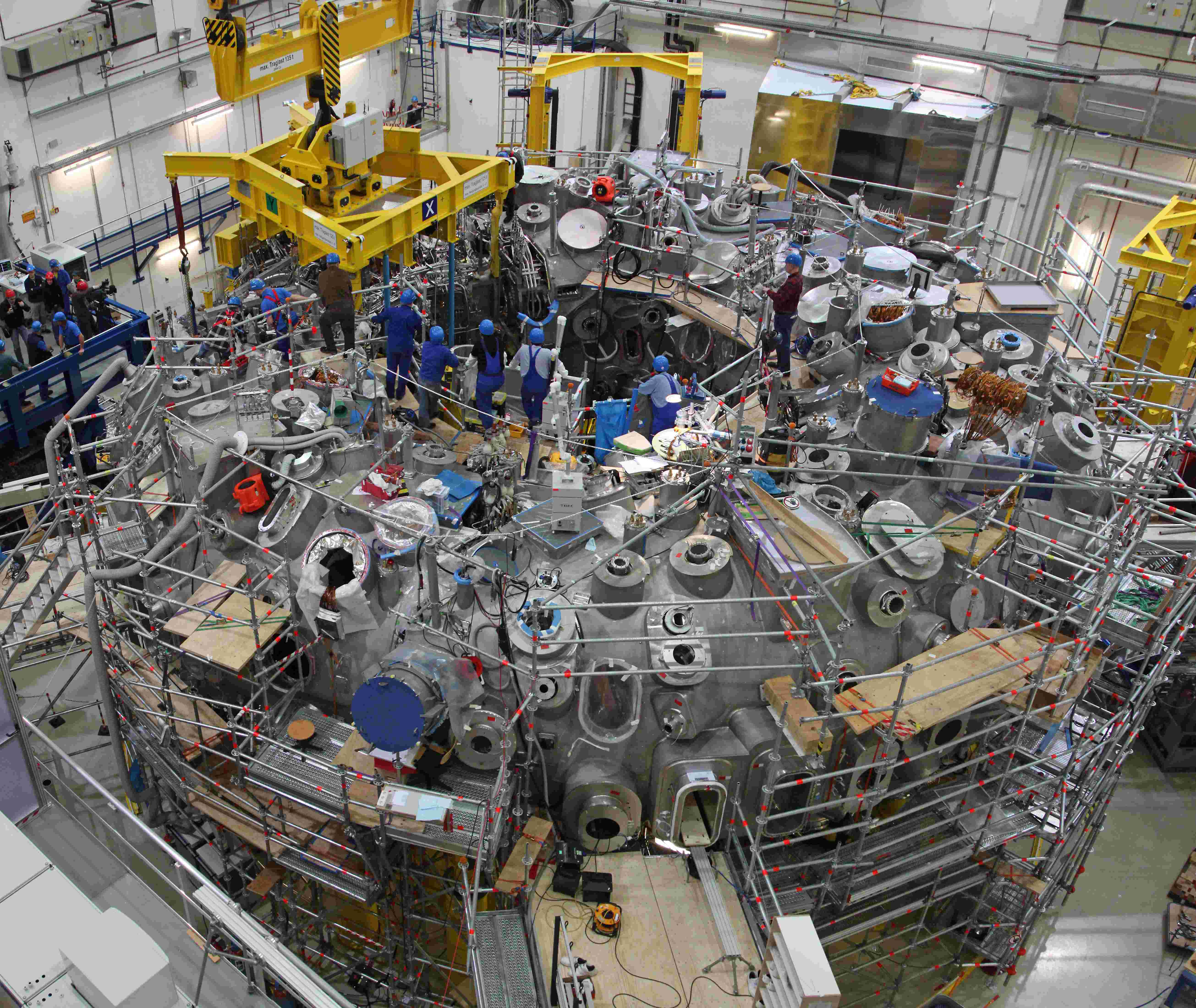
The Wendelstein7X under construction

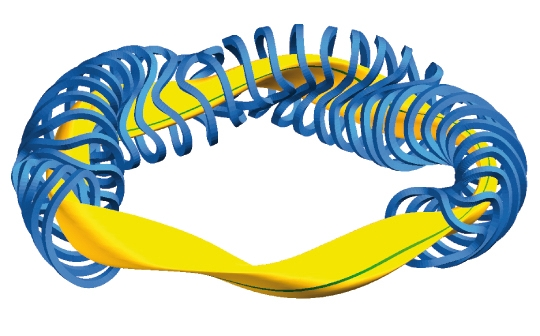
Example of a stellarator design: A coil system (blue) surrounds plasma (yellow). A magnetic field line is highlighted in green on the yellow plasma surface.

The Naval Research Laboratory demonstrated over 90,000 shots in 10 hours in 2013.

Private and public research accelerated in the 2010s.

=== Private projects ===
In 2017, General Fusion developed its plasma injector technology and Tri Alpha Energy constructed and operated its C-2U device. In August 2014, Phoenix Nuclear Labs announced the sale of a high-yield neutron generator that could sustain 5×10^{11} deuterium fusion reactions per second over a 24-hour period.

In October 2014, Lockheed Martin's Skunk Works announced the development of a high beta fusion reactor, the Compact Fusion Reactor.

In January 2015, the polywell was presented at Microsoft Research. TAE Technologies announced that its Norman reactor had achieved plasma.

ST40 generated "first plasma".

In 2018, Eni announced a $50 million investment in Commonwealth Fusion Systems, to attempt to commercialize ARC technology using a test reactor (SPARC) in collaboration with MIT. The reactor planned to employ yttrium barium copper oxide (YBCO) high-temperature superconducting magnet technology. Commonwealth Fusion Systems in 2021 tested successfully a 20 T magnet making it the strongest high-temperature superconducting magnet in the world. Following the 20 T magnet CFS raised $1.8 billion from private investors.

General Fusion began developing a 70% scale demo system. In 2018, TAE Technologies' reactor reached nearly 20 M°C.

=== Government and academic projects ===
In 2010, NIF researchers conducted a series of "tuning" shots to determine the optimal target design and laser parameters for high-energy ignition experiments with fusion fuel. Net fuel energy gain was achieved in September 2013.

In April 2014, LLNL ended the Laser Inertial Fusion Energy (LIFE) program and directed their efforts towards NIF.

A 2012 paper demonstrated that a dense plasma focus had achieved temperatures of 1.8 billion degrees Celsius, sufficient for boron fusion, and that fusion reactions were occurring primarily within the contained plasmoid, necessary for net power.

In August 2014, MIT announced a tokamak it named the ARC fusion reactor, using rare-earth barium-copper oxide (REBCO) superconducting tapes to construct high-magnetic field coils that it claimed produced comparable magnetic field strength in a smaller configuration than other designs.

In October 2015, researchers at the Max Planck Institute of Plasma Physics completed building the largest stellarator to date, the Wendelstein 7-X. In December they produced the first helium plasma, and in February 2016 produced hydrogen plasma.

In 2014 EAST achieved a record confinement time of 30 seconds for plasma in the high-confinement mode (H-mode), thanks to improved heat dispersal. This was an order of magnitude improvement vs other reactors. In 2017 the reactor achieved a stable 101.2-second steady-state high confinement plasma, setting a world record in long-pulse H-mode operation.

In 2018 MIT scientists formulated a theoretical means to remove the excess heat from compact nuclear fusion reactors via larger and longer divertors.

In 2019 the United Kingdom announced a planned £200-million (US$248-million) investment to produce a design for a fusion facility named the Spherical Tokamak for Energy Production (STEP), by the early 2040s.

== 2020s ==
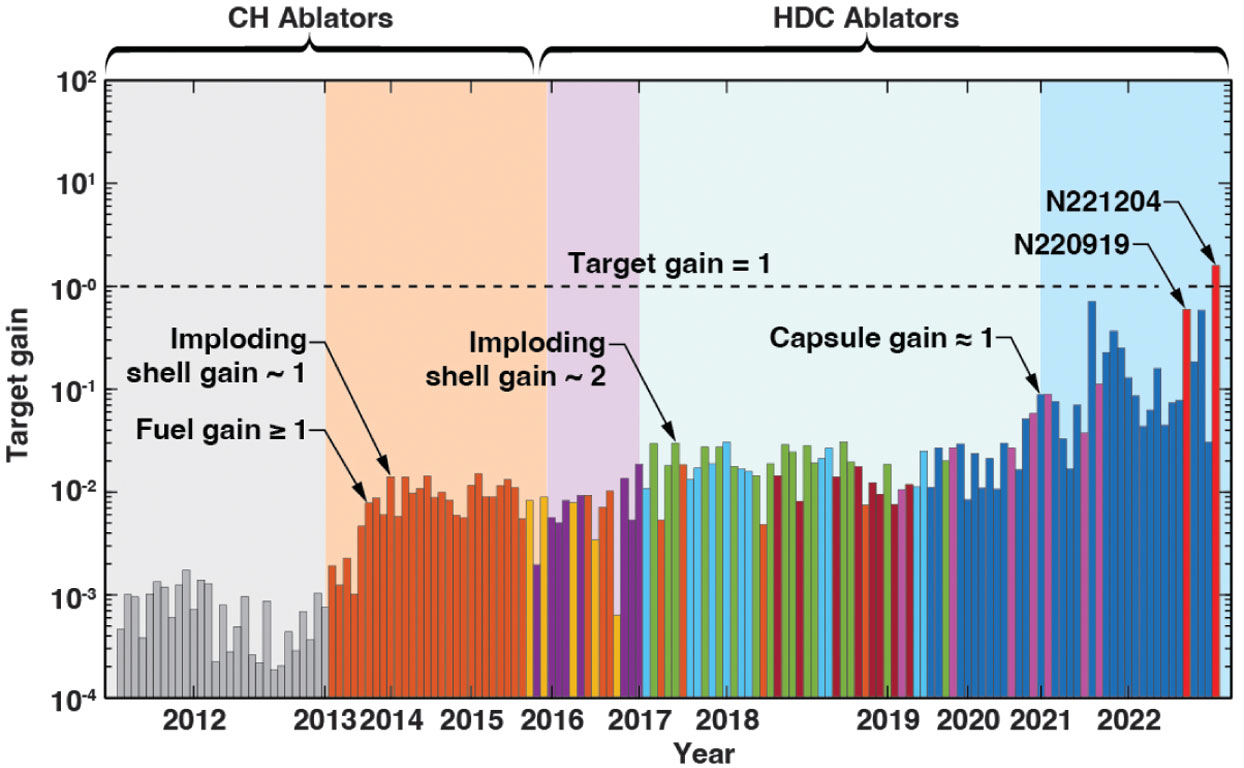
Plot of target gain in ICF experiments at NIF from 2012 to 2022. Note the ten-fold increase in August 2021 and the achievement of target gain over 1 in December 2022.

In December 2020, the Chinese experimental nuclear fusion reactor HL-2M achieved its first plasma discharge. In May 2021, Experimental Advanced Superconducting Tokamak (EAST) announced a new world record for superheated plasma, sustaining a temperature of 120 M°C for 101 seconds and a peak of 160 M°C for 20 seconds. In December 2021 EAST set a new world record for high temperature (70 M°C) plasma of 1,056 seconds.

In 2020, Chevron Corporation announced an investment in start-up Zap Energy, co-founded by British entrepreneur and investor, Benj Conway, together with physicists Brian Nelson and Uri Shumlak from University of Washington. In 2021 the company raised $27.5 million in Series B funding led by Addition.

In 2021, the US DOE launched the INFUSE program, a public-private knowledge sharing initiative involving a PPPL, MIT Plasma Science and Fusion Center and Commonwealth Fusion Systems partnership, together with partnerships with TAE Technologies, Princeton Fusion Systems, and Tokamak Energy. In 2021, DOE's Fusion Energy Sciences Advisory Committee approved a strategic plan to guide fusion energy and plasma physics research that included a working power plant by 2040, similar to Canadian, Chinese, and U.K. efforts.

In January 2021, SuperOx announced the commercialization of a new superconducting wire, with more than 700 A/mm2 current capability.

TAE Technologies announced that its Norman device had sustained a temperature of about 60 million degrees C for 30 milliseconds, 8 and 10 times higher, respectively, than the company's previous devices. The duration was claimed to be limited by the power supply rather than the device.

In August 2021, the National Ignition Facility recorded a record-breaking 1.3 megajoules of energy created from fusion which is the first example of the Lawson criterion being surpassed in a laboratory.

In February 2022, JET sustained 11 MW and a Q value of 0.33 for over 5 seconds, outputting 59.7 megajoules, using a mix of deuterium and tritium for fuel. In March 2022 it was announced that Tokamak Energy achieved a record plasma temperature of 100 million kelvins, inside a commercial compact tokamak.

In October 2022, the Korea Superconducting Tokamak Advanced Research (KSTAR) reached a record plasma duration of 45 seconds, sustaining the high-temperature fusion plasma over the 100 million degrees Celsus based on the integrated real-time RMP control for ELM-less H-mode, i.e. fast ions regulated enhancement (FIRE) mode, machine learning algorithm, and 3D field optimization via an edge-localized RMP.

In December 2022, the NIF achieved the first scientific breakeven controlled fusion experiment, with an energy gain of 1.5.

In February 2024, the KSTAR tokamak set a new record (shot #34705) for the longest duration (102 seconds) of a magnetically confined plasma. The plasma was operated in the H-mode, with much better control of the error field than was possible previously. KSTAR also set a record (shot #34445) for the longest steady-state duration at a temperature of 100 million degrees Celsius (48 seconds, ELM-LESS FIRE mode).

== See also ==
- Timeline of nuclear fusion
- Fusion power § History
- Timeline of nuclear weapons development
- Timeline of nuclear power
