= Nova (laser) =

High-power laser at the Lawrence Livermore National Laboratory

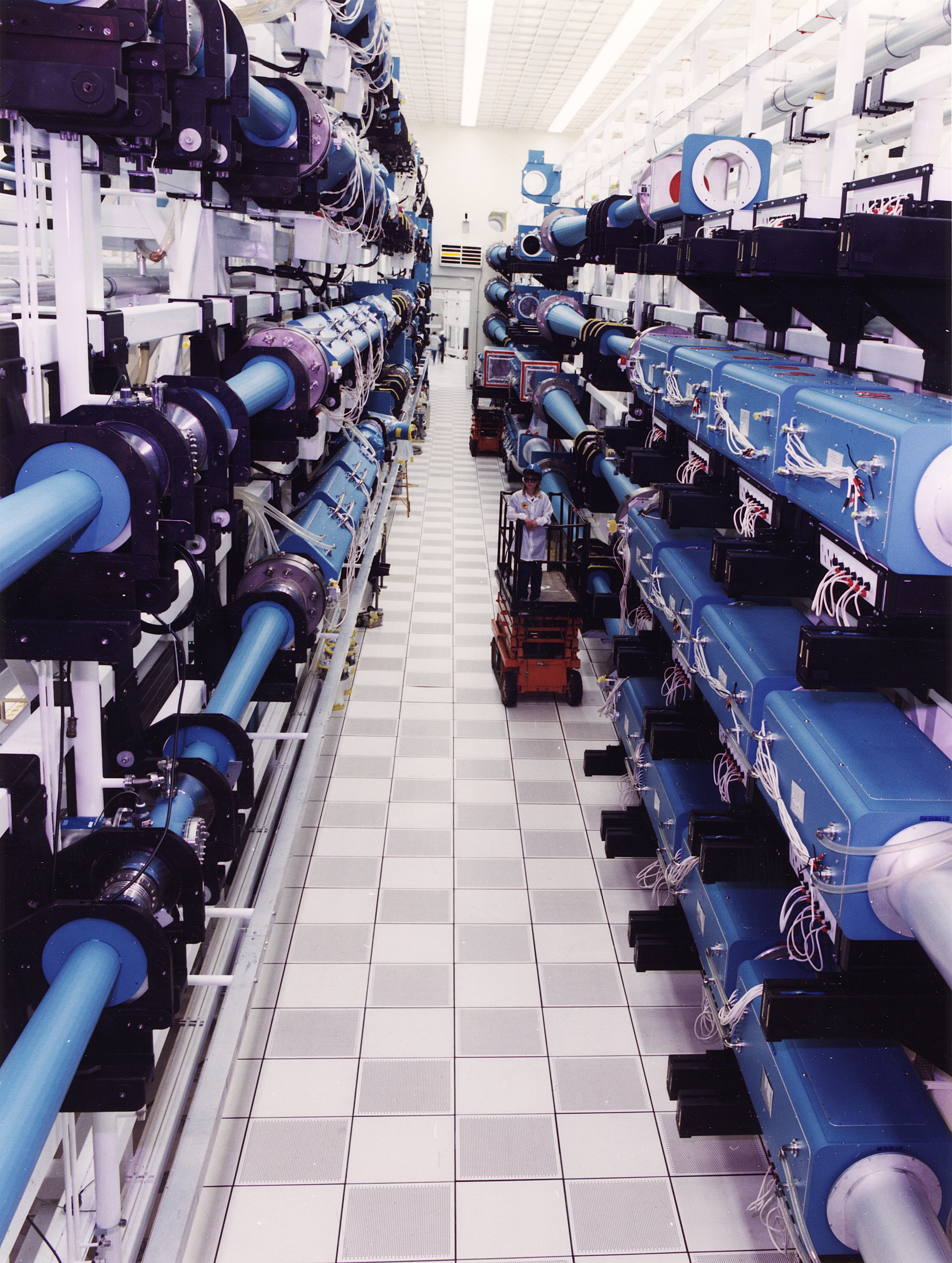
View down Nova's laser bay between two banks of beamlines. The blue boxes contain the amplifiers and their flashtube "pumps", the tubes between the banks of amplifiers are the spatial filters.

Nova was a high-power laser built at the Lawrence Livermore National Laboratory (LLNL) in California, United States, in 1984 which conducted advanced inertial confinement fusion (ICF) experiments until its dismantling in 1999. Nova was the first ICF experiment built with the intention of reaching "ignition", the condition where self heating of the fusion plasma exceeds all losses. Although Nova failed in this goal, the data it generated clearly defined the problem as being mostly a result of Rayleigh–Taylor instability, leading to the design of the National Ignition Facility, Nova's successor. Nova also generated considerable amounts of data on high-density matter physics, regardless of the lack of ignition, which is useful both in fusion power and nuclear weapons research.

== Background ==
Inertial confinement fusion (ICF) devices use drivers to rapidly heat the outer layers of a target in order to compress it. The target is a small spherical pellet containing a few milligrams of fusion fuel, typically a mix of deuterium and tritium. The heat of the driving laser burns the surface of the pellet into a plasma, which explodes off the surface. The remaining portion of the target is driven inwards due to Newton's third law, eventually collapsing into a small point of very high density.

The rapid blowoff also creates a shock wave that travels towards the center of the compressed fuel. When it reaches the center of the fuel and meets the shock from the other side of the target, the energy in the shock wave further heats and compresses the tiny volume around it. If the temperature and density of that small spot can be raised high enough, fusion reactions in a small portion of the fuel will occur.

The fusion reactions release high-energy particles, some of which (primarily alpha particles) collide with the remaining high-density fuel around it and slow down. This heats the fuel, and can potentially cause that fuel to undergo fusion as well. Given the right overall conditions of the compressed fuel—high enough temperature and high enough product of density and time during which the plasma is confined by its own inertia—this heating process can result in ignition, initiating a burn wave outward from the central hot spot.

To date, most ICF experiments have used lasers to heat the targets. Calculations show that the energy must be delivered quickly in order to compress the core before it disassembles, as well as creating a suitable shock wave. The energy must also be focused extremely evenly across the target's outer surface in order to collapse the fuel into a symmetric core. Although other "drivers" have been suggested, notably heavy ions driven in particle accelerators, lasers are currently the only devices with the right combination of features.

== History ==
LLNL's history with the ICF program starts with physicist John Nuckolls, who predicted in 1972 that ignition could be achieved with laser energies about 1 kJ, while "high gain" would require energies around 1 MJ. Although this sounds very low powered compared to modern machines, at the time it was just beyond the state of the art, and led to a number of programs to produce lasers in this power range.

Prior to the construction of Nova, LLNL had designed and built a series of ever-larger lasers that explored the problems of basic ICF design. LLNL was primarily interested in the Nd:glass laser, which, at the time, was one of a very few high-energy laser designs known. LLNL had decided early on to concentrate on glass lasers, while other facilities studied gas lasers using carbon dioxide (e.g. Antares laser, Los Alamos National Laboratory) or KrF (e.g. Nike laser, Naval Research Laboratory). Building large Nd:glass lasers had not been attempted before, and LLNL's early research focused primarily on how to make these devices.

One problem was the homogeneity of the beams. Even minor variations in intensity of the beams would result in "self-focusing" in the air and glass optics in a process known as Kerr lensing. The resulting beam included small "filaments" of extremely high light intensity, so high it would damage the glass optics of the device. This problem was solved in the Cyclops laser with the introduction of the spatial filtering technique. Cyclops was followed by the Argus laser of greater power, which explored the problems of controlling more than one beam and illuminating a target more evenly. All of this work culminated in the Shiva laser, a proof-of-concept design for a high power system that included 20 separate "laser amplifiers" that were directed around the target to illuminate it.

It was during experiments with Shiva that another serious unexpected problem appeared. The infrared light generated by the Nd:glass lasers was found to interact very strongly with the electrons in the plasma created during the initial heating through the process of stimulated Raman scattering. This process, referred to as "hot electron pre-heating", carried away a great amount of the laser's energy, and also caused the core of the target to heat before it reached maximum compression. This meant that much less energy was being deposited in the center of the collapse, both due to the reduction in implosion energy, as well as the outward force of the heated core. Although it was known that shorter wavelengths would reduce this problem, it had earlier been expected that the IR frequencies used in Shiva would be "short enough". This proved not to be the case.

A solution to this problem was explored in the form of efficient frequency multipliers, optical devices that combine several photons into one of higher energy, and thus frequency. These devices were quickly introduced and tested experimentally on the OMEGA laser and others, proving effective. Although the process is only about 50% efficient, and half the original laser power is lost, the resulting ultraviolet light couples much more efficiently to the target plasma and is much more effective in collapsing the target to high density.

With these solutions in hand, LLNL decided to build a device with the power needed to produce ignition conditions. Design started in the late 1970s, with construction following shortly starting with the testbed Novette laser to validate the basic beamline and frequency multiplier design. This was a time of repeated energy crises in the U.S. and funding was not difficult to find given the large amounts of money available for alternative energy and nuclear weapons research.

== Design ==
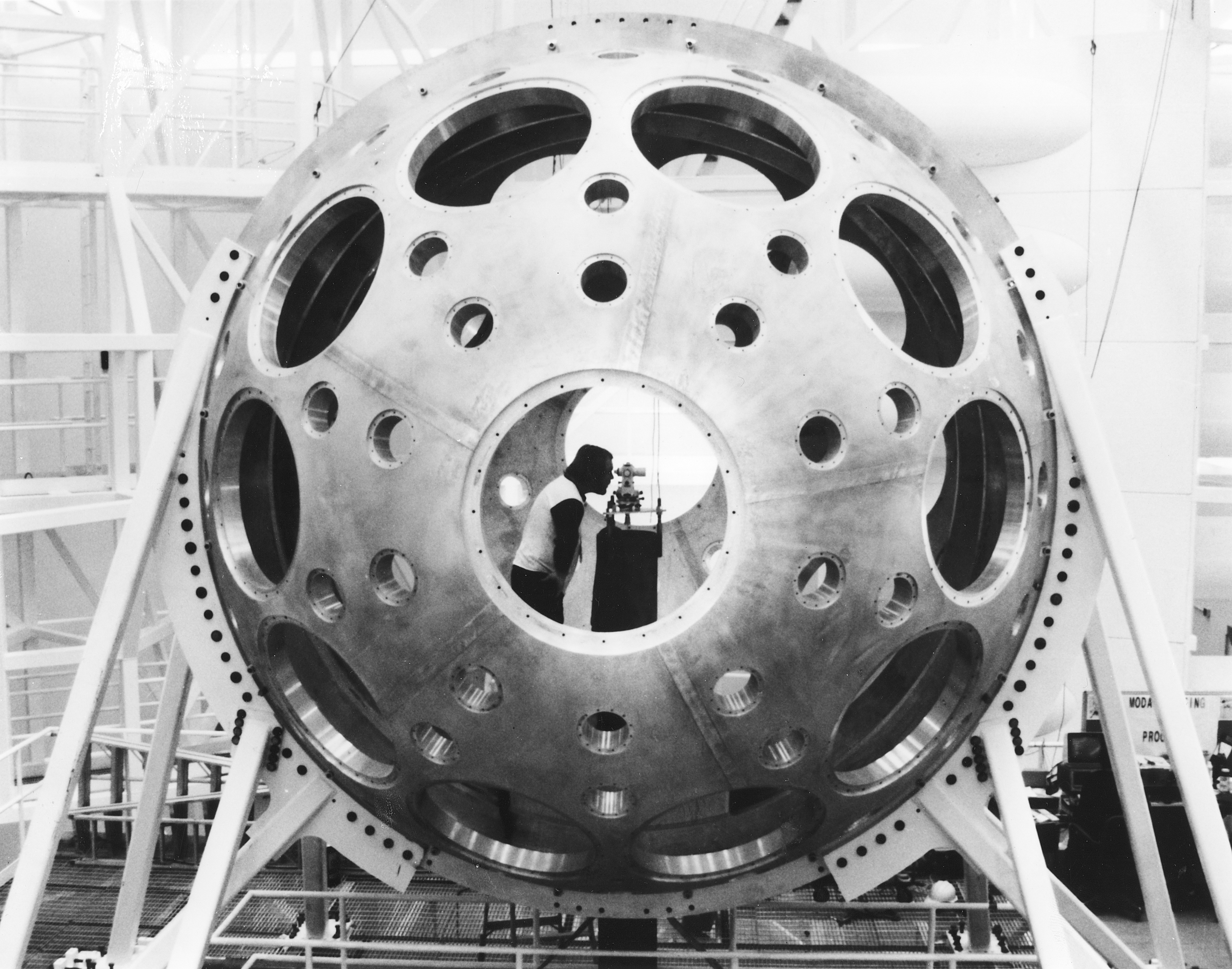
The Nova laser target chamber during alignment and initial installation (ca. early 1980s). Some of the larger diameter holes hold various measurement devices, which are designed to a standard size to fit into these ports while others are used as beam ports.

During the initial construction phase, Nuckolls found an error in his calculations, and an October 1979 review chaired by John Foster Jr. of TRW confirmed that there was no way Nova would reach ignition. The Nova design was then modified into a smaller design that added frequency conversion to 351 nm light, which would increase coupling efficiency. The "new Nova" emerged as a system with ten laser amplifiers, or beamlines. Each beamline consisted of a series of Nd:glass amplifiers separated by spatial filters and other optics for cleaning up the resulting beams. Although techniques for folding the beamlines were known as early as Shiva, they were not well developed at this point in time. Nova ended up with a single fold in its layout, and the laser bay containing the beamlines was 300 feet (91 m) long. To the casual observer it appears to contain twenty 300-foot (91 m) long beamlines, but due to the fold each of the ten is actually almost 600 feet (180 m) long in terms of optical path length.

Prior to firing, the Nd:glass amplifiers are first pumped with a series of Xenon flash lamps surrounding them. Some of the light produced by the lamps is captured in the glass, leading to a population inversion that allows for amplification via stimulated emission. This process is quite inefficient, and only about 1 to 1.5% of the power fed into the lamps is actually turned into laser energy. In order to produce the sort of laser power required for Nova, the lamps had to be very large, fed power from a large bank of capacitors located under the laser bay. The flash also generates a large amount of heat which distorts the glass, requiring time for the lamps and glass to cool before they can be fired again. This limits Nova to about six firings a day at the maximum.

Once pumped and ready for firing, a small pulse of laser light is fed into the beamlines. The Nd:glass disks each dump additional power into the beam as it passes through them. After passing through a number of amplifiers the light pulse is "cleaned up" in a spatial filter before being fed into another series of amplifiers. At each stage additional optics were used to increase the diameter of the beam and allow the use of larger and larger amplifier disks. In total, Nova contained fifteen amplifiers and five filters of increasing size in the beamlines, with an option to add an additional amplifier on the last stage, although it is not clear if these were used in practice.

From there all ten beams pass into the experiment area at one end of the laser bay. Here a series of mirrors reflects the beams to impinge in the center of the bay from all angles. Optical devices in some of the paths slow the beams so that they all reach the center at the same time (within about a picosecond), as some of the beams have longer paths to the center than others. Frequency multipliers upconvert the light to green and blue (UV) just prior to entering the "target chamber". Nova is arranged so any remaining IR or green light is focused short of the center of the chamber.

The Nova laser as a whole was capable of delivering approximately 100 kilojoules of infrared light at 1054 nm, or 40-45 kilojoules of frequency tripled light at 351 nm (the third harmonic of the Nd:Glass fundamental line at 1054 nm) in a pulse duration of about 2 to 4 nanoseconds and thus was capable of producing a UV pulse in the range of 16 trillion watts.

== Fusion in Nova ==
Research on Nova was focussed on the indirect drive approach, where laser light is focused onto the inside surface of a thin metal foil, typically made of gold, lead, or another high-Z metal. When heated by the laser, the metal re-radiates this energy as diffuse X-rays, which are more efficient than UV at compressing the fuel pellet. In order to emit X-rays, the metal must be heated to very high temperatures, which uses up a considerable amount of the laser energy. So while the compression is more efficient, the overall energy delivered to the target is nevertheless much smaller. The reason for the X-ray conversion is not to improve energy delivery, but to "smooth" the energy profile; since the metal foil spreads out the heat somewhat, the anisotropies in the original laser are greatly reduced.

The foil shells, or hohlraums, are generally formed as small open-ended cylinders, with the laser arranged to shine into the open ends at an oblique angle in order to strike the inner surface. In order to support the indirect drive research at Nova, a second experimental area was built "past" the main one, opposite the laser bay. The system was arranged to focus all ten beams into two sets of five each, which passed into this second area and then into either end of the target chamber, and from there into the hohlraums.

Confusingly, the indirect drive approach was not made widely public until 1993. Documents from the Nova era published in general science magazines and similar materials either gloss over the issue, or imply that Nova was using the direct drive approach, lacking the hohlraums.

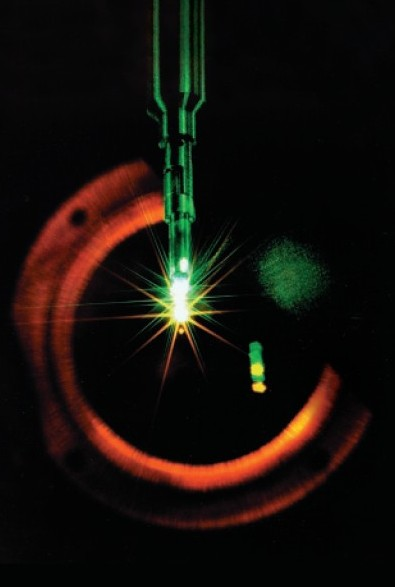
Fusion target implosion on Nova. The green coloring of the target holder is due to the leftover laser light that was upconverted only "halfway" to UV, stopping at green. The optics are arranged to focus this light "short" of the target, and here it strikes the holder. A small amount of IR light is also left over, but this cannot be seen in this visible-light photograph. An estimate of the size of the implosion can be made by comparing the size of the target holder here with the image above.

As had happened with the earlier Shiva, Nova failed to meet expectations in terms of fusion output. The maximum fusion yield on NOVA was about 10^{13} neutrons per shot. In this case the problem was tracked to instabilities that caused turbulent mixing of the fuel during collapse and upset the formation and transmission of the shock wave. The problem was caused by Nova's inability to closely match the output energy of each of the beamlines, which meant that different areas of the pellet received different amounts of heating across its surface. This led to hot spots on the pellet which were imprinted into the imploding plasma, seeding Rayleigh–Taylor instabilities and thereby mixing the plasma so the center did not collapse uniformly.

Nevertheless, Nova remained a useful instrument even in its original form, and the main target chamber and beamlines were used for many years even after it was modified as outlined below. A number of different techniques for smoothing the beams were attempted over its lifetime, both to improve Nova as well as better understand NIF. These experiments added considerably not only to the understanding of ICF, but also to high-density physics in general, and even the evolution of the galaxy and supernovas.

== Modifications ==
=== Two beam ===
Shortly after completion of Nova, modifications were made to improve it as an experimental device.

One problem was that the experimental chamber took a long time to refit for another shot, longer than the time needed to cool down the lasers. In order to improve utilization of the laser, a second experimental chamber was built behind the original, with optics that combined the ten beamlines into two. Nova had been built up against the older Shiva buildings, with the two experimental chambers back to back and the beamlines extending outward from the center target areas. The Two Beam system was installed by passing the beamguides and related optics through the now unused Shiva experimental area and placing the smaller experimental chamber in Shiva's beam bay.

=== LMF and Nova Upgrade ===
Nova's partial success, combined with other experimental numbers, prompted Department of Energy to request a custom military ICF facility they called the "Laboratory Microfusion Facility" (LMF) that could achieve fusion yield between 100 and 1000 MJ. Based on the LASNEX computer models, it was estimated that LMF would require a driver of about 10 MJ, in spite of nuclear tests that suggested a higher energy. Building such a device was within the state of the art, but would be expensive, on the order of $1 billion. LLNL returned a design with a 5 MJ 350 nm (UV) driver laser that would be able to reach about 200 MJ yield, which was enough to access the majority of the LMF goals. The program was estimated to cost about $600 million FY 1989 dollars, and an additional $250 million to upgrade it to a full 1000 MJ if needed, and would grow to well over $1 billion if LMF was to meet all of the goals the DOE asked for. Other labs also proposed their own LMF designs using other technologies.

Faced with this enormous project, in 1989/90 National Academy of Sciences conducted a second review of the US ICF efforts on behalf of the US Congress. The report concluded that "considering the extrapolations required in target physics and driver performance, as well as the likely $1 billion cost, the committee believes that an LMF [i.e. a Laser Microfusion Facility with yields to one gigajoule] is too large a step to take directly from the present program." Their report suggested that the primary goal of the program in the short term should be resolving the various issues related to ignition, and that a full-scale LMF should not be attempted until these problems were resolved. The report was also critical of the gas laser experiments being carried out at LANL, and suggested they, and similar projects at other labs, be dropped. The report accepted the LASNEX numbers and continued to approve an approach with laser energy around 10 MJ. Nevertheless, the authors were aware of the potential for higher energy requirements, and noted "Indeed, if it did turn out that a 100-MJ driver were required for ignition and gain, one would have to rethink the entire approach to, and rationale for, ICF."

In July 1992 LLNL responded to these suggestions with the Nova Upgrade, which would reuse the majority of the existing Nova facility, along with the adjacent Shiva facility. The resulting system would be much lower power than the LMF concept, with a driver of about 1 to 2 MJ. The new design included a number of features that advanced the state of the art in the driver section, including the multi-pass design in the main amplifiers, and 18 beamlines (up from 10) that were split into 288 "beamlets" as they entered the target area in order to improve the uniformity of illumination. The plans called for the installation of two main banks of laser beam lines, one in the existing Nova beam line room, and the other in the older Shiva building next door, extending through its laser bay and target area into an upgraded Nova target area. The lasers would deliver about 500 TW in a 4 ns pulse. The upgrades were expected to allow the new Nova to produce fusion yields between 2 and 20 MJ The initial estimates from 1992 estimated construction costs around $400 million, with construction taking place from 1995 to 1999.

For reasons that are not well recorded in the historical record, later in 1992 LLNL updated their Nova Upgrade proposal and stated that the existing Nova/Shiva buildings would no longer be able to contain the new system, and that a new building about three times as large would be needed. From then on the plans evolved into the current National Ignition Facility.

=== Petawatt ===
Starting in the late 1980s a new method of creating very short but very high power laser pulses was developed, known as chirped pulse amplification, or CPA. Starting in 1992, LLNL staff modified one of Nova's existing arms to build an experimental CPA laser that produced up to 1.25 PW. Known simply as Petawatt, it operated until 1999 when Nova was dismantled to make way for NIF.

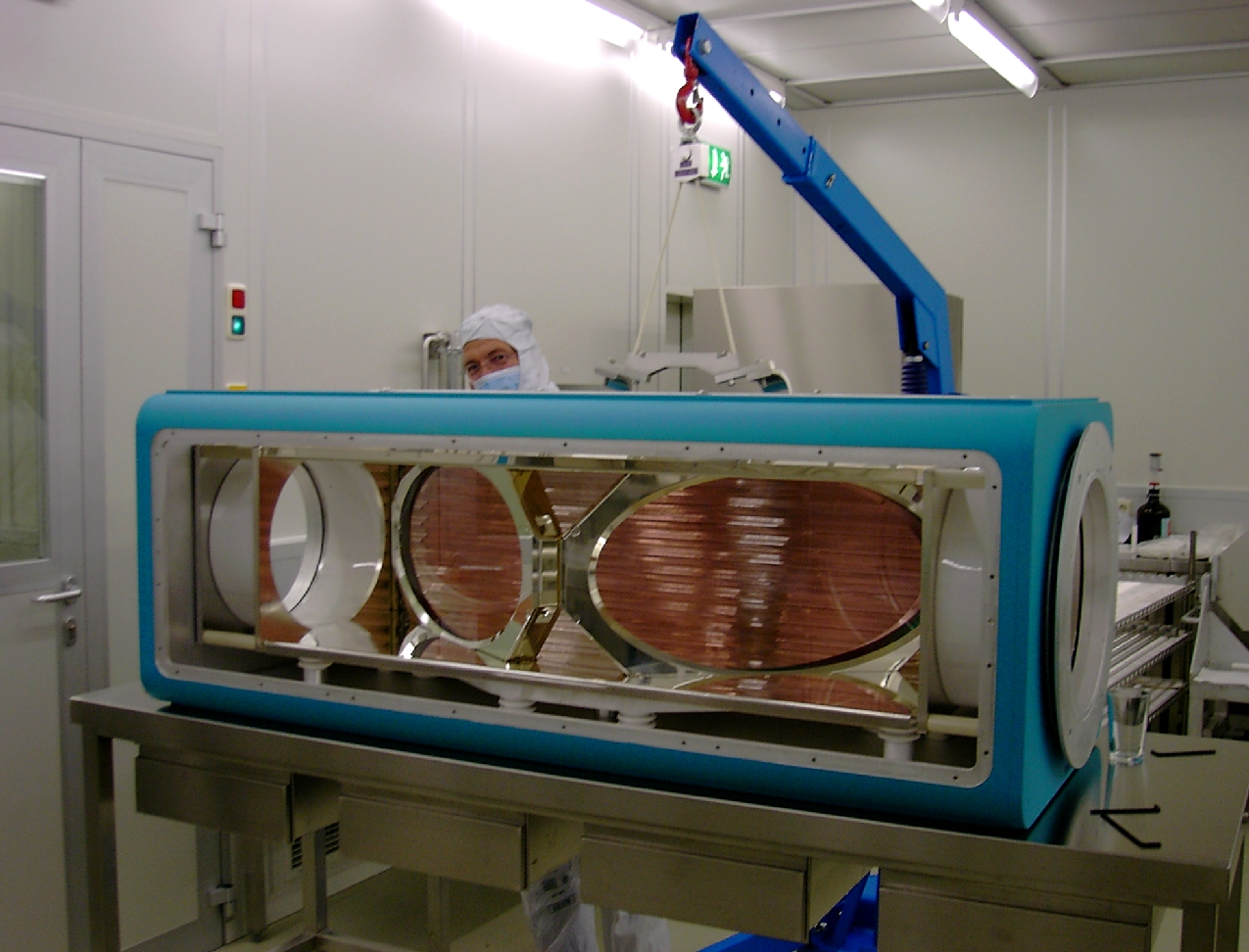
An opened A315 amplifier of the NOVA system, loaned 2003 to the PHELIX laser facility at the GSI institute in Germany; note the octagonal shaped laser disks in the middle, behind are one of the two flashlamp panels used to exceed population inversion

The basic amplification system used in Nova and other high-power lasers of its era was limited in terms of power density and pulse length. One problem was that the amplifier glass responded over a period of time, not instantaneously, and very short pulses would not be strongly amplified. Another problem was that the high power densities led to the same sorts of self-focusing problems that had caused problems in earlier designs, but at such a magnitude that even measures like spatial filtering would not be enough, in fact the power densities were high enough to cause filaments to form in air.

CPA avoids both of these problems by spreading out the laser pulse in time. It does this by reflecting a relatively multi-chromatic (as compared to most lasers) pulse off a series of two diffraction gratings, which splits them spatially into different frequencies, essentially the same thing a simple prism does with visible light. These individual frequencies have to travel different distances when reflected back into the beamline, resulting in the pulse being "stretched out" in time. This longer pulse is fed into the amplifiers as normal, which now have time to respond normally. After amplification the beams are sent into a second pair of gratings "in reverse" to recombine them into a single short pulse with high power. In order to avoid filamentation or damage to the optical elements, the entire end of the beamline is placed in a large vacuum chamber.

Although Petawatt was instrumental in advancing the practical basis for the concept of fast ignition fusion, by the time it was operational as a proof-of-concept device, the decision to move ahead with NIF had already been taken. Further work on the fast ignition approach continues, and will potentially reach a level of development far in advance of NIF at HiPER, an experimental system under development in the European Union.

== "Death" of Nova ==
When Nova was being dismantled to make way for NIF, the target chamber was lent to France for temporary use during the development of Laser Megajoule, a system similar to NIF in many ways. This loan was controversial, as the only other operational laser at LLNL at the time, Beamlet (a single experimental beamline for NIF), had recently been sent to Sandia National Laboratory in New Mexico. This left LLNL with no large laser facility until NIF started operation, which was then estimated as being 2003 at the earliest. Work on NIF was not declared formally completed until March 31, 2009.

== Bibliography ==
- Kilkenny, J.D.; et al. (May 1992). "Recent Nova Experimental Results". Fusion Technology. 21 (3): 1340–1343 Part 2A. Bibcode:1992FuTec..21.1340K. doi:10.13182/FST92-A29909.
- Hammel, B.A. (December 2006). "The NIF Ignition Program: progress and planning". Plasma Physics and Controlled Fusion. 48 (12B): B497–B506 Sp. Iss. SI. Bibcode:2006PPCF...48B.497H. doi:10.1088/0741-3335/48/12B/S47. S2CID 120380196.
- Coleman, L.W. (December 1987). "Recent Experiments With The Nova Laser". Journal of Fusion Energy. 6 (4): 319–327. Bibcode:1987JFuE....6..319C. doi:10.1007/BF01052066. S2CID 123594537.
