= Compact fusion =

Compact fusion can refer to:

- Lockheed Martin Compact Fusion Reactor
- ARC fusion reactor
