= Lockheed Martin Compact Fusion Reactor =

2010 American fusion reactor project

The Lockheed Martin Compact Fusion Reactor (CFR) was a fusion power project at Lockheed Martin’s Skunk Works. Its high-beta configuration, which implies that the ratio of plasma pressure to magnetic pressure is greater than or equal to 1 (compared to tokamak designs' 0.05), allows a compact design and expedited development. The project was active between 2010 and 2019; after that date there have been no updates and it appears the division has shut down.

The CFR chief designer and technical team lead, Thomas McGuire studied fusion as a source of space propulsion in response to a NASA desire to improve travel times to Mars.

== History ==
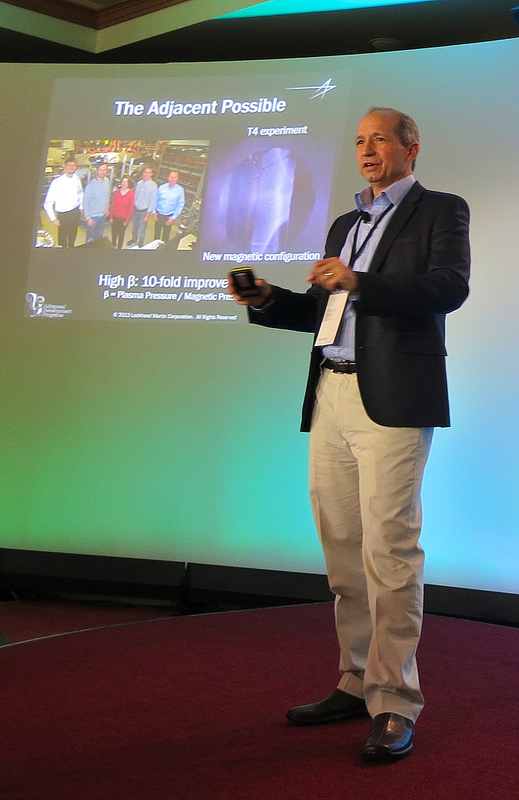
Charles Chase giving a presentation of the reactor concept in 2013

The project began in 2010, and was publicly presented at the Google Solve for X forum on February 7, 2013. In October 2014, Lockheed Martin announced a plan to "build and test a compact fusion reactor in less than a year with a prototype to follow within five years". In May 2016, Rob Weiss announced that Lockheed Martin continued to support the project and would increase its investment in it.

The project was halted sometime before 2021.

== Design ==
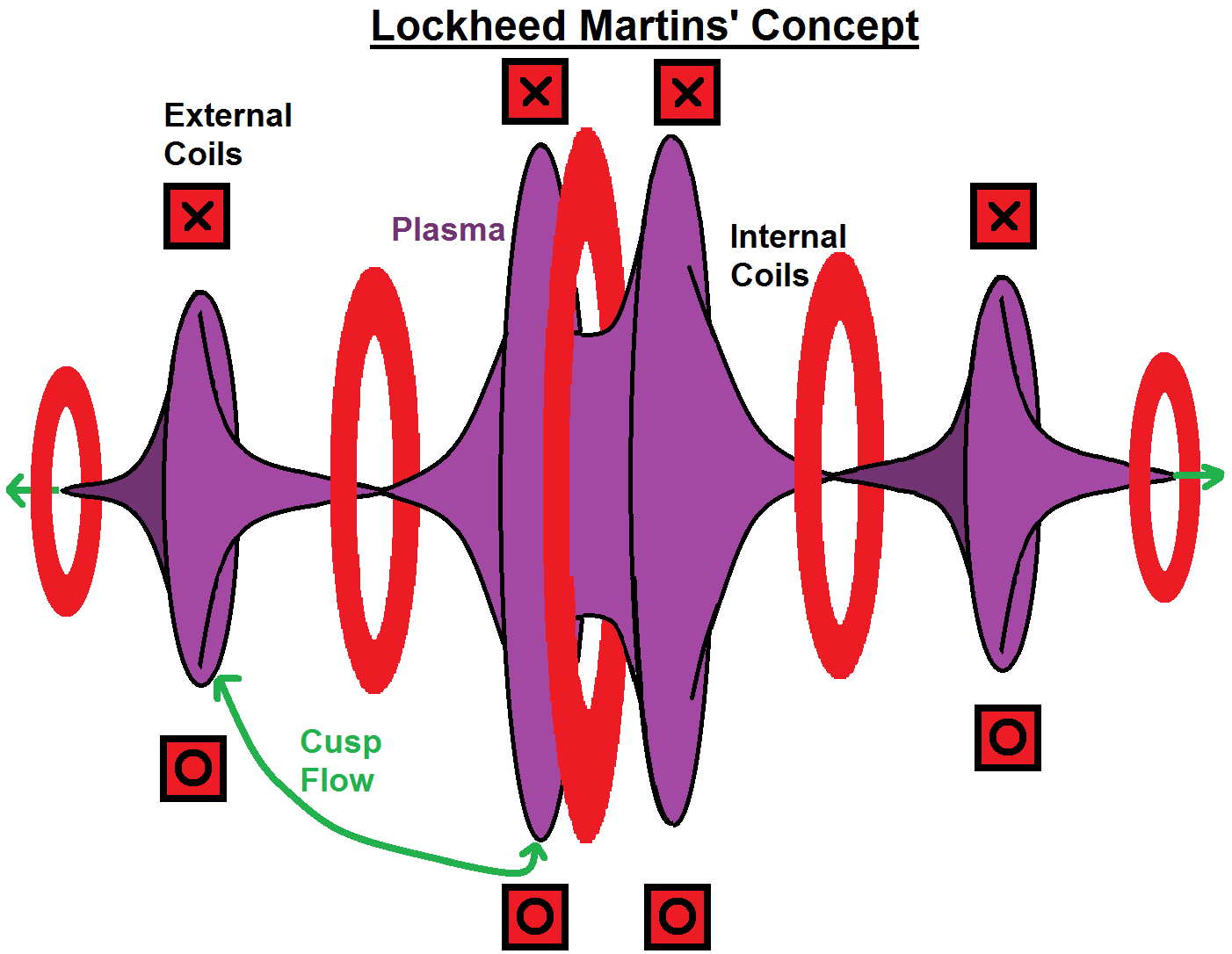
A sketch of the plasma geometry and magnetic coils inside an early model of Lockheed Martins' compact fusion reactor. This design has since been superseded with a model using only two main cusps.

CFR plans to achieve high beta (the ratio of plasma pressure to the magnetic pressure) by combining cusp confinement and magnetic mirrors to confine the plasma. Cusps are sharply bent magnetic fields. Ideally, the plasma forms a sheath along the surface of the cusps and plasma leaks out along the axis and edges of the sharply bent field. The plasma lost along the edges recycles back into the cusps.

CFR uses two mirror sets. A pair of ring mirrors is placed inside the cylindrical reactor vessel at either end. The other mirror set encircles the reactor cylinder. The ring magnets produce a type of magnetic field known as a diamagnetic cusp, in which magnetic forces rapidly change direction and push the nuclei towards the midpoint between the two rings. The fields from the external magnets push the nuclei back towards the vessel ends.

CFR employs superconducting magnets. These allow strong magnetic fields to be created with less energy than conventional magnets. The CFR has no net current, which Lockheed claimed eliminates the prime source of plasma instabilities. The plasma has a favorable surface-to-volume ratio, which improves confinement. The plasma's small volume reduces the energy needed to achieve fusion.

The project plans to replace the microwave emitters that heat the plasma in their prototypes with neutral beam injection, in which electrically neutral deuterium atoms transfer their energy to the plasma. Once initiated, the energy from fusion maintains the necessary temperature for subsequent fusion events.

The company claims that each design iteration is shorter and far lower cost than large-scale projects such as the Joint European Torus, ITER or NIF.

A 200 MW P_{th} reactor, 18 m long by 7 m in diameter, produces about a 2000 ton reactor, similar in size to an A5W nuclear submarine fission reactor.

=== Challenges ===
Ring magnets require protection from the plasma's neutron radiation. Plasma temperatures must reach many millions of kelvins. Superconducting magnets must be kept just above absolute zero to maintain superconductivity.

The blanket component that lines the reactor vessel has two functions: it captures the neutrons and transfers their energy to a coolant, and forces the neutrons to collide with lithium atoms, transforming them into tritium to fuel the reactor. The blanket must be an estimated 80–150 cm thick and weigh 300–1000 tons.

== Prototypes ==
The prototype was planned to be a 100-megawatt deuterium and tritium reactor measuring 7 by 10 feet (2.1 by 3.0 m) that could fit on the back of a large truck and would be about one tenth the size of current reactor prototypes. 100 megawatts is enough to provide power for 80,000 people. A series of prototypes was constructed to approach this goal.

=== T-4 ===
Technical results presented on the T4 experiment in 2015 showed a cold, partially ionized plasma with the following parameters: peak electron temperature of 20 electron volts, 10^{16} m^{−3} electron density, less than 1% ionization fraction and 3 kW of input power. No confinement or fusion reaction rates were presented.

McGuire presented two theoretical reactor concepts in 2015. One was an ideal configuration weighing 200 metric tons with 1 meter of cryogenic radiation shielding and 15 tesla magnets. The other was a conservative configuration weighing 2,000 metric tons, with 2 meters of cryogenic radiation shielding and 5 tesla magnets.

=== T4B ===
The T4B prototype was announced in 2016.

Parameters:

- 1 m diameter × 2 m long
  - 1 MW, 25 keV H-neutral beam heating power
  - 3 ms duration
- Assume 500 kW is converted into fast ions.
- n = 5×10^{19} m^{−3}
- β = 1 (field = 0.1 T)
- V = 0.2 m^{3}, 1170 J total energy
- Peak T_{i} = 75 eV
- Peak T_{e} = 250 eV
- Peak sheath loss = 228 kW, about equal to P_{ei}
- Peak ring cusp loss = 15 kW
- Peak axial cusp loss = 1 kW

=== TX reactor ===
Parameters:

- 7 m diameter × 18 m long, 1 m thick blankets
- 320 MW gross
- 40 MW heating power, 2.3 s
- n = 5×10^{20} m^{−3}
- β = 1 (field = 2.3 T)
- V = 16.3 m^{3}, 51 MJ total energy
- T_{i} = 9.6 keV
- T_{e} = 12.6 keV

=== T5 ===
In July 2019, Jeff Babione – vice president and general manager of Skunk Works – stated: "This year we are constructing another reactor – T5 – which will be a significantly larger and more powerful reactor than our T4, We are current scheduled to have that go online towards the end of this year, so that will be another significant leap in capability and towards demonstrating that the physics underlining our concept works."

The T5 reactor was planned to show the heating and inflation of the plasma, as well as measure the depth of the trapped magnetized sheath protecting the walls from the plasma. It also helps measure the losses at the boundaries of the magnetic field lines containing the plasma intersect or wrap around stalks holding the reactor's superconducting magnets. In particular, T5 will demonstrate the high-density plasma source and the ability to capture and confine the neutral beam injectors that ignite the plasma.

== Criticism ==
Physics professor and director of the UK's national Fusion laboratory Steven Cowley called for more data, pointing out that the current thinking in fusion research is that "bigger is better". According to Cowley, experience building other fusion reactors suggests that when machine size is doubled one achieves 8 times improvement in heat confinement, that is how much of the extremely high temperatures needed for the fusion reaction can be contained without e.g. heating the cooled superconducting magnets too much. Cowley thus questions the suggested small size of a working machine.

== See also ==
- ARC fusion reactor
- China Fusion Engineering Test Reactor
- Fusion Industry Association
- Fusor
- General Fusion
- History of nuclear fusion
- Inertial electrostatic confinement
- Polywell
- Spherical Tokamak for Energy Production
- TAE Technologies
