= Shiva laser =

Infrared laser

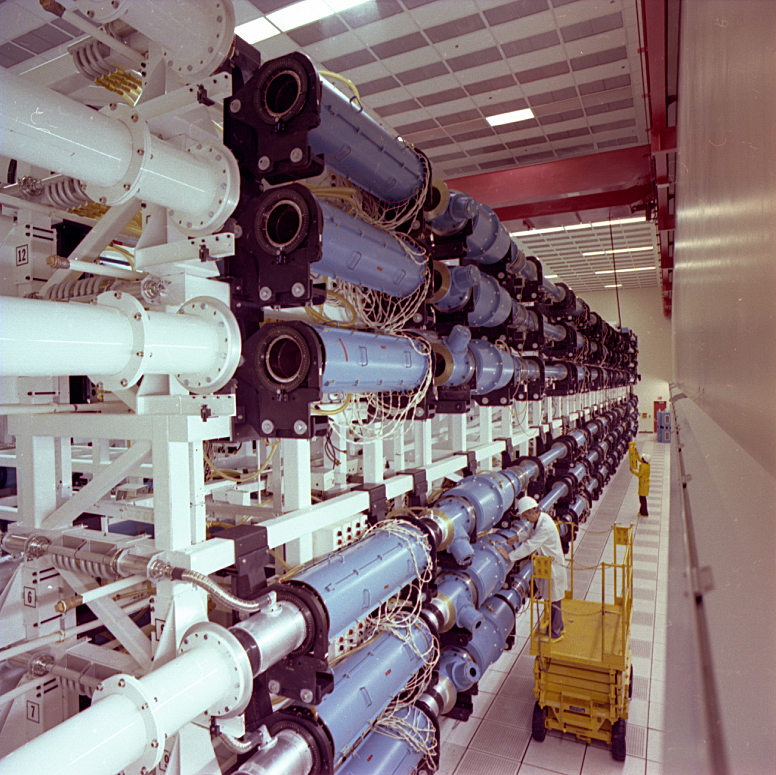
Shiva amplifier chains showing spatial filter tubes (white) and Nd:glass amplifier structures (short blue tubes closest to camera). Portions of the 1982 Disney film Tron were filmed at the site.

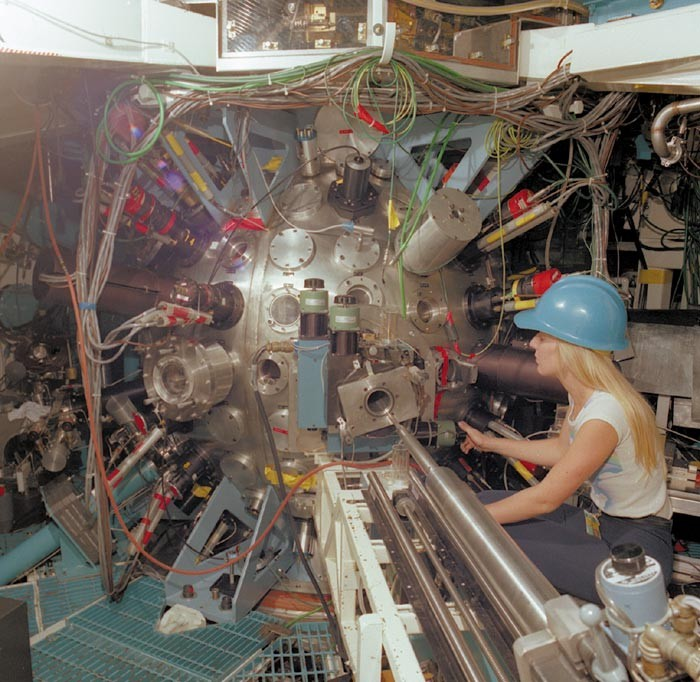
Shiva target chamber during maintenance.

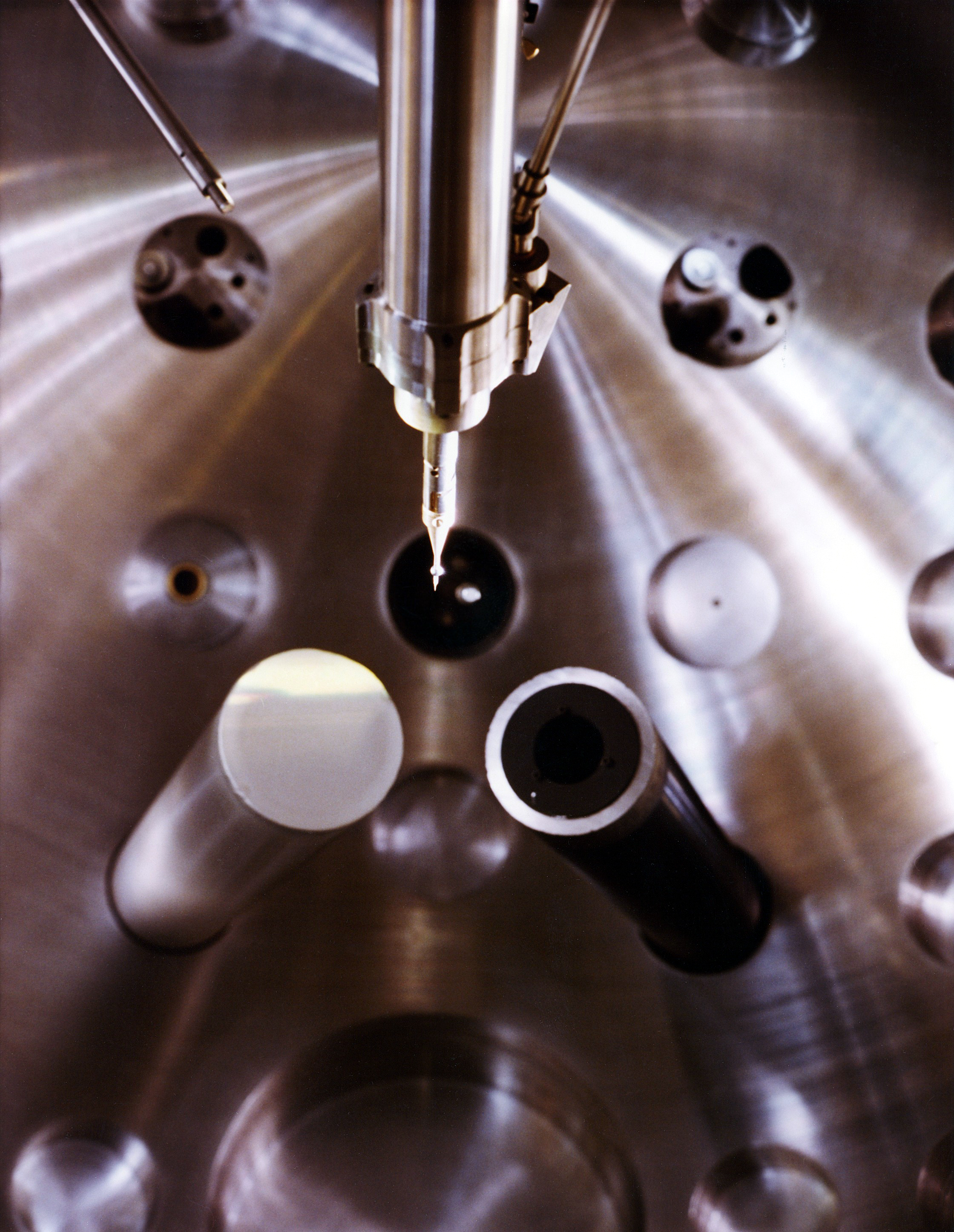
View inside the Shiva target chamber, 1978. The needle-like object in the center of the image is the target holder, various instruments are pointed to image the explosions at its tip.

The Shiva laser was a powerful 20-beam infrared neodymium glass (silica glass) laser built at Lawrence Livermore National Laboratory in 1977 for the study of inertial confinement fusion (ICF) and long-scale-length laser-plasma interactions. Presumably, the device was named after the multi-armed form of the Hindu god Shiva, due to the laser's multi-beamed structure. Shiva was instrumental in demonstrating a particular problem in compressing targets with lasers, leading to a major new device being constructed to address these problems, the Nova laser.

== Background ==
The basic idea of any ICF device is to rapidly heat the outer layers of a "target", normally a small plastic sphere containing a few milligrams of fusion fuel, typically a mix of deuterium and tritium. The heat burns the plastic into a plasma, which explodes off the surface. Because of Newton's third law, the remaining portion of the target is driven inwards, eventually collapsing into a small point of very high density. The rapid blowoff also creates a shock wave that travels towards the center of the compressed fuel. When it meets itself in the center of the fuel, the energy in the shock wave further heats and compresses the tiny volume around it. If the temperature and density of that small spot is raised high enough, fusion reactions will occur.

The fusion reactions release high-energy alpha particles, which collide with the high density fuel around it and slow down. This heats the fuel further, and can potentially cause that fuel to undergo fusion as well. Given the right overall conditions of the compressed fuel – high enough density and temperature – this heating process can result in a chain reaction, burning outward from the center where the shock wave started the reaction. This is a condition known as "ignition", which can lead to a significant portion of the fuel in the target undergoing fusion, and the release of significant amounts of energy.

To date most ICF experiments have used lasers to heat the targets. Calculations show that the energy must be delivered quickly in order to compress the core before it disassembles, as well as creating a suitable shock wave. The laser beams must also be focussed evenly across the target's outer surface in order to collapse the fuel into a symmetric core. Although other "drivers" have been suggested, lasers are currently the only devices with the right combination of features.

== Description ==
Shiva incorporated many of the advancements achieved on the earlier Cyclops and Argus lasers, notably the use of amplifiers made of Nd:glass slabs set at the Brewster's angle and the use of long vacuum spatial filters to "clean" the resulting laser beams. These features have remained a part of every ICF laser since, which leads to long "beamlines". In the case of Shiva, the beamlines were about 30 m long.

Prior to firing, the laser glass of the Shiva was "pumped" with light from a series of xenon flash lamps fed power from a large capacitor bank. Some of this light is absorbed by the neodymium atoms in the glass, raising them to an excited state and leading to a population inversion which readies the lasing medium for amplification of a laser beam. A small amount of laser light, generated externally, was then fed into the beamlines, passing through the glass and becoming amplified through the process of stimulated emission. This is not a particularly efficient process; in total, around ~1% of the electricity used to feed the lamps ends up amplifying the beam on most Nd:glass lasers.

After each amplifier module there was a spatial filter, which was used to smooth the beam by removing any nonuniformity or power anisotropy which had accumulated due to nonlinear focusing effects of intense light passage through air and glass. The spatial filter is held under vacuum in order to eliminate the creation of plasma at the focus (pinhole).

After the light had passed through the final amplifier and spatial filter it was then used for experiments in the target chamber, lying at one end of the apparatus. Shiva's 20 beamlines each delivered about 500 Joules of energy, which together delivered a ~.5 to 1 nanosecond pulse of 10.2 kJ of infrared light at 1062 nm wavelength, or smaller peak powers over longer times (3 kJ for 3 ns).

The entire device, including test equipment and buildings, cost about $25 million when it was completed in 1977 ($130 million today).

== Shiva and ICF ==
Shiva was never expected to reach ignition conditions, and was primarily intended as a proof-of-concept system for a larger device that would. Even before Shiva was completed, the design of this successor, then known as Shiva/Nova, was well advanced. Shiva/Nova would emerge as Nova in 1984. Shiva was heavily instrumented, and its target chamber utilized high-resolution, high-speed optical and X-ray instruments for the characterization of the plasmas created during implosion.

When experiments with targets started in Shiva in 1978, compression was ramped upward to about 50 to 100 times the original density of the liquid hydrogen, or about 3.5 to 7 g/mL. For comparison, lead has a density of about 11 g/mL. While impressive, this level of compression is far too low to be useful in an attempt to reach ignition, and far lower than simulations had estimated for the system.

Studies of the causes of the lower than expected compression led to the realization that the laser was coupling strongly with the hot electrons (~50 keV) in the plasma which formed when the outer layers of the target were heated, via stimulated raman scattering. John Holzrichter, director of the ICF program at the time, said:

The laser beam generates a dense plasma where it impinges on the target material. The laser light gives up its energy to the electrons in the plasma, which absorb the light. The rate at which that happens depends on the wavelength and the intensity. On Shiva, we were heating up electrons to incredible energies, but the targets were not performing well. We tried a lot of stuff to coax the electrons to transfer more of their energy to the target, with no success.

It was earlier realized that laser energy absorption on a surface scaled favorably with reduced wavelength, but it was believed at that time that the IR generated in the Shiva Nd:glass laser would be sufficient for adequately performing target implosions. Shiva proved this assumption wrong, showing that irradiating capsules with infrared light would likely never achieve ignition or gain. Thus Shiva's greatest advance was in its failure, an example of a null result.

ICF research turned to using an "optical frequency multiplier" to convert the incoming IR light into the ultraviolet at about 351 nm, a technique that was well known at the time but was not efficient enough to be worthwhile. Research on the GDL laser at the Laboratory for Laser Energetics in 1980 first achieved efficient frequency tripling techniques which were then used next (for the first time at LLNL) on Shiva's successor, the Novette laser. Every laser-driven ICF system after Shiva has used this technique.

On January 24, 1980, a 5.8 M_{w} earthquake (the first in a doublet) shook Livermore and the facility enough to shear fist-sized bolts off Shiva; repairs were made and the laser was subsequently put back online a month later. Many experiments including testing the "indirect mode" of compression using hohlraums continued at Shiva until its dismantling in 1981. Shiva's target chamber would be reused on the Novette laser. Maximum fusion yield on Shiva was around 10^{10} to 10^{11} neutrons per shot.

== See also ==
- Lawrence Livermore National Laboratory
- List of laser types
- Shiva Star
