= Cyclops laser =

High-power laser

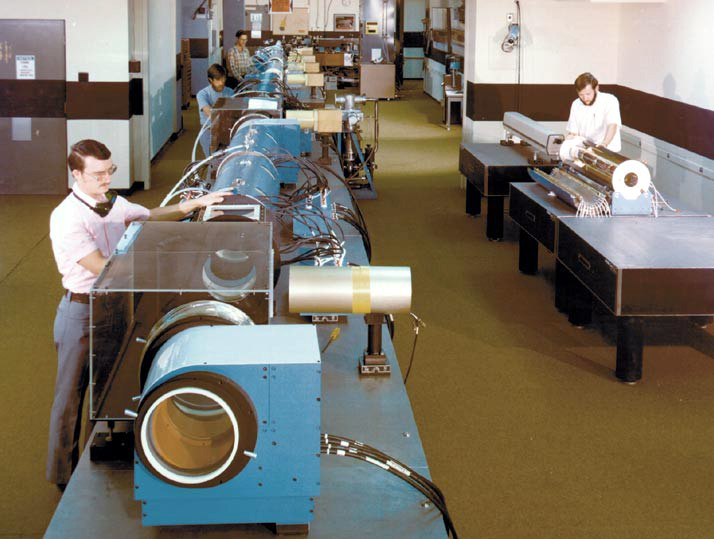
The single beam Cyclops laser at LLNL around the time of its completion in 1975.

Cyclops was a high-power laser built at the Lawrence Livermore National Laboratory (LLNL) in 1975. It was the second laser constructed in the lab's Laser program, which aimed to study inertial confinement fusion (ICF).

The Cyclops was a single-beam Neodymium glass (Nd:glass) laser. The Janus laser, a two-beam version of it, was also completed in 1975. The main scientific aims of its construction were for the study of nonlinear focusing effects in high power laser beams, novel amplification techniques (disks of Nd:glass at the brewster angle), spatial filtering techniques which would be used on subsequent higher powered lasers such as the Argus and Shiva lasers and for inertial confinement fusion (ICF) research.

== Background ==
Even the earliest ICF laser experiments demonstrated that one of the main problems which needed to be addressed was poor focusing of the beams and damage caused to optics due to the beam's extreme intensities caused by the optical Kerr effect, where, because the beam is so intense, that during its passage through either air or glass the electric field of the light actually alters the index of refraction of the material and causes the beam at the most intense points to "self focus" down to filament like structures of extremely high intensity. When a beam collapses into extremely high intensity filaments like this, it can easily exceed the laser damage threshold of laser glass and other optics, severely damaging them by creating pits, cracks and grey tracks through the glass.

This novel problem only became obvious as the lasers were scaled up in power to where nonlinear phenomena occur with very intense beams of light. LLNL's Krupke stated:

If the intensity of the light gets high enough —as in fusion lasers— the electric field in the light perturbs the atoms of the glass so strongly that the glass responds in a nonlinear way.

At the time there was no strong theoretical understanding of these effects, and predicting them was difficult. However, LLNL researchers combined their own efforts with those of the commercial glass vendors and were able to develop a new predictive tool which explained the relationship between the nonlinear effect intensity to all types of glass. As Krupke noted:

It was like the Rosetta stone. With this quantitative correspondence, they were able to plot the nonlinear refractive performance of millions of glasses and find the one with the lowest possible value. We then worked with our industrial partners to make a composition with the characteristics we needed.

Although using the proper glass was able to reduce the problem as much as possible, the problem still existed. For smaller experiments this would not be enough of an effect to worry about, but with the much larger and more powerful Shiva already under design, some way of further improving the beam smoothness of the laser needed to be studied.

The simplest way to eliminate these effects was to filter them out physically using what essentially amounts to a Fourier transform technique applied to the beam's spatial intensity profile. Imaging spatial filters are, in effect, small inverted telescopes inserted in the laser beam to focus the light through a pinhole. Many modes of spatial anisotropy would result in a very low angle of diffraction off the centerline however, so to improve the smoothing performance, the spatial filter tube is extremely long, thereby maximizing the distance the filaments moved from the centerline. Such a laser had not previously been built, the earlier Janus laser, which explored the Nd:glass laser itself, was only a few meters long.

It was precisely the problems of building a long laser that Cyclops was built to study. Cyclops was effectively a single-beam of the larger Shiva design, one that could be completed as quickly as possible in order to identify potential problems and come up with the best arrangement for the filters. In this goal Cyclops was successful, and every major ICF effort since has used the spatial filtering technique, leading to ever-growing laser "beamlines" on the order of 100 m today.

While Cyclops was still under construction, another LLNL laser was being built that also incorporated the spatial filtering technique, Argus. Argus passed its light through a series of amplifiers, with spatial filters between each stage and easily achieved terawatt beam powers.

== See also ==
- Laser
- Lawrence Livermore National Laboratory
- List of laser types
