= Argus laser =

Infrared laser

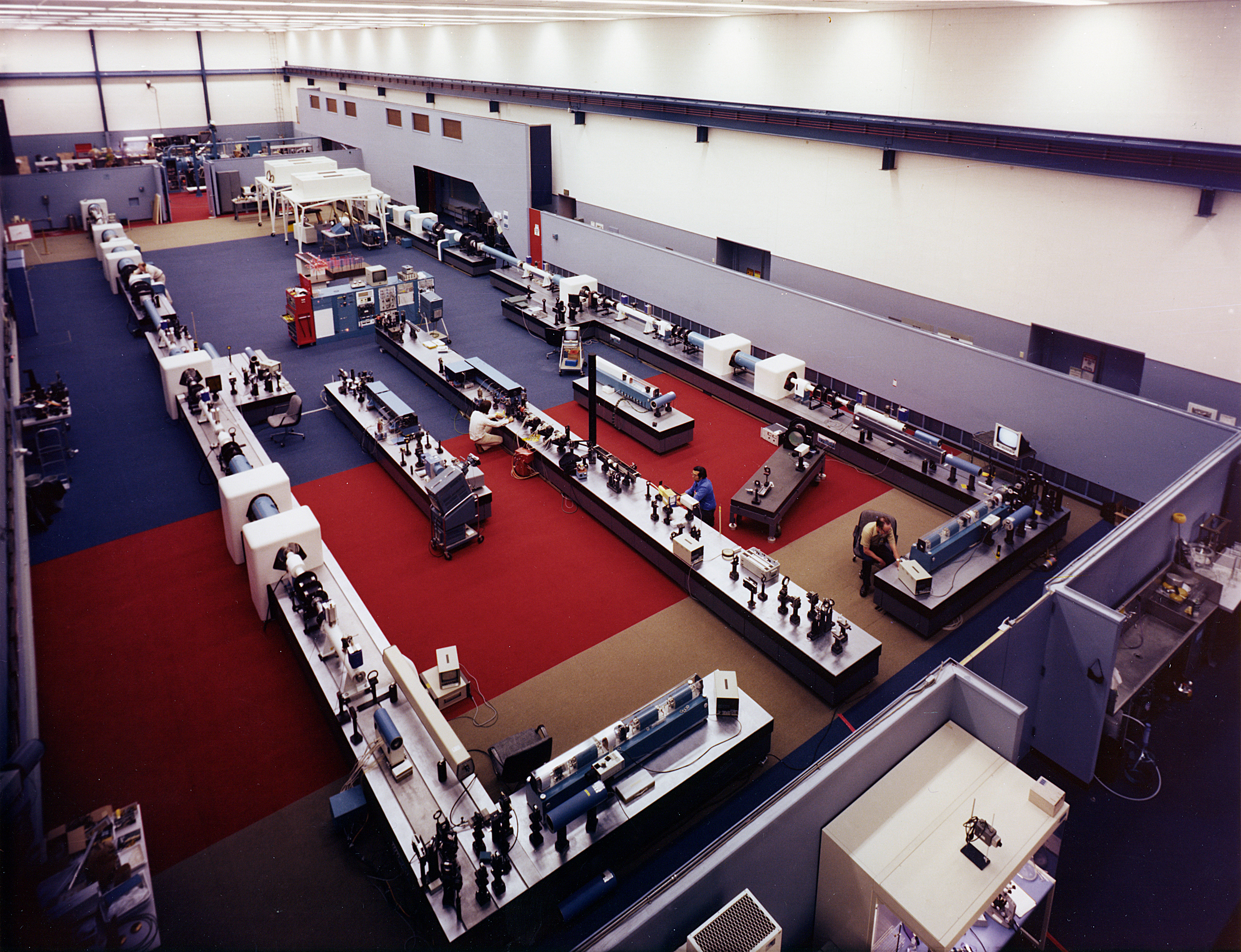
Argus laser overhead view. The target chamber area is at the far wall (upper left).

Argus was a two-beam high power infrared neodymium doped silica glass laser with a 20 cm (7.9 in) output aperture built at Lawrence Livermore National Laboratory in 1976 for the study of inertial confinement fusion. Argus advanced the study of laser-target interaction and paved the way for the construction of its successor, the 20 beam Shiva laser.

It was known from some of the earlier experiments in ICF that when large laser systems amplified their beams beyond a certain point (typically around the gigawatt level), nonlinear optical effects would begin to appear due to the very intense nature of the light. The most serious effect among these was "Kerr lensing", where, because the beam is so intense, that during its passage through either air or glass the electric field of the light actually alters the index of refraction of the material and causes the beam at the most intense points to "self focus" down to filament like structures of extremely high intensity. When a beam collapses into extremely high intensity filaments like this, it can easily exceed the optical damage threshold of laser glass and other optics, severely damaging them by creating pits, cracks and grey tracks through the glass. These effects became so severe after just the first few amplification stages of early lasers, that it was seen as essentially impossible to exceed the gigawatt level for ICF lasers without destroying the laser itself after just a few shots.

In order to improve the quality of the amplified beams, LLNL had started experimenting with the use of spatial filters in the single-beam Cyclops laser, built the previous year. The basic idea was to extend the laser device into a very long "beamline", over which any imperfections that accumulated in the beam would be successively removed after every amplification stage. A series of tubes with lenses on either end would focus the light down to a point (the focal point) where it would pass through a pinhole which would reject stray unfocused light, smoothing the beam and eliminating the high intensity spots which would have otherwise been further amplified causing damage to down-beam optics. The technique was so successful on Argus it was often referred to as being "the savior of laser ICF".

After the success of Cyclops in beam smoothing, the next step was to further increase the energy and power in the resulting beams. Argus used a series of five groups of amplifiers and spatial filters arranged along the beamlines, each one boosting power until it reached a total of about 1 kilojoule and 1-2 terawatts per beam. These intensities would have been impossible to achieve without the use of spatial filtering. Argus was designed primarily to characterize large laser beamlines and laser-target interactions, there was no attempt to actually achieve the fusion ignition state in the device as this was understood to be impossible at the energies Argus was capable of delivering. Argus however, was used to further explore higher yields of the so-called "exploding pusher" type targets and to develop x-ray diagnostic cameras to view the hot plasma in such targets, a technique crucial to characterization of target performance on later ICF lasers.

Argus was capable of producing a total of about 4 terawatts of power in short pulses of up to about 100 picoseconds, or about 2 terawatts of power in a longer 1 nanosecond pulse (~2 kilojoules) on a 100 micrometer diameter fusion fuel capsule target. It became the first laser to perform experiments using X-rays produced by irradiating a hohlraum. The reduced production of hard X-ray energy via the production of hot electrons while using frequency doubled and tripled laser light (as opposed to the infrared light directly produced by the laser itself) was first noticed on Argus. This technique would also be later validated in the direct drive mode (at both the LLE and Novette laser) and subsequently used to enhance laser energy to target plasma coupling efficiency in experiments on nearly all subsequent laser inertial confinement devices. Argus was shut down and dismantled in September 1981. Maximum fusion yield for target implosions on Argus was about 10^{9} neutrons per shot.

== See also ==
- Laser
- Lawrence Livermore National Laboratory
- List of laser articles
- List of laser types
