= Novette laser =

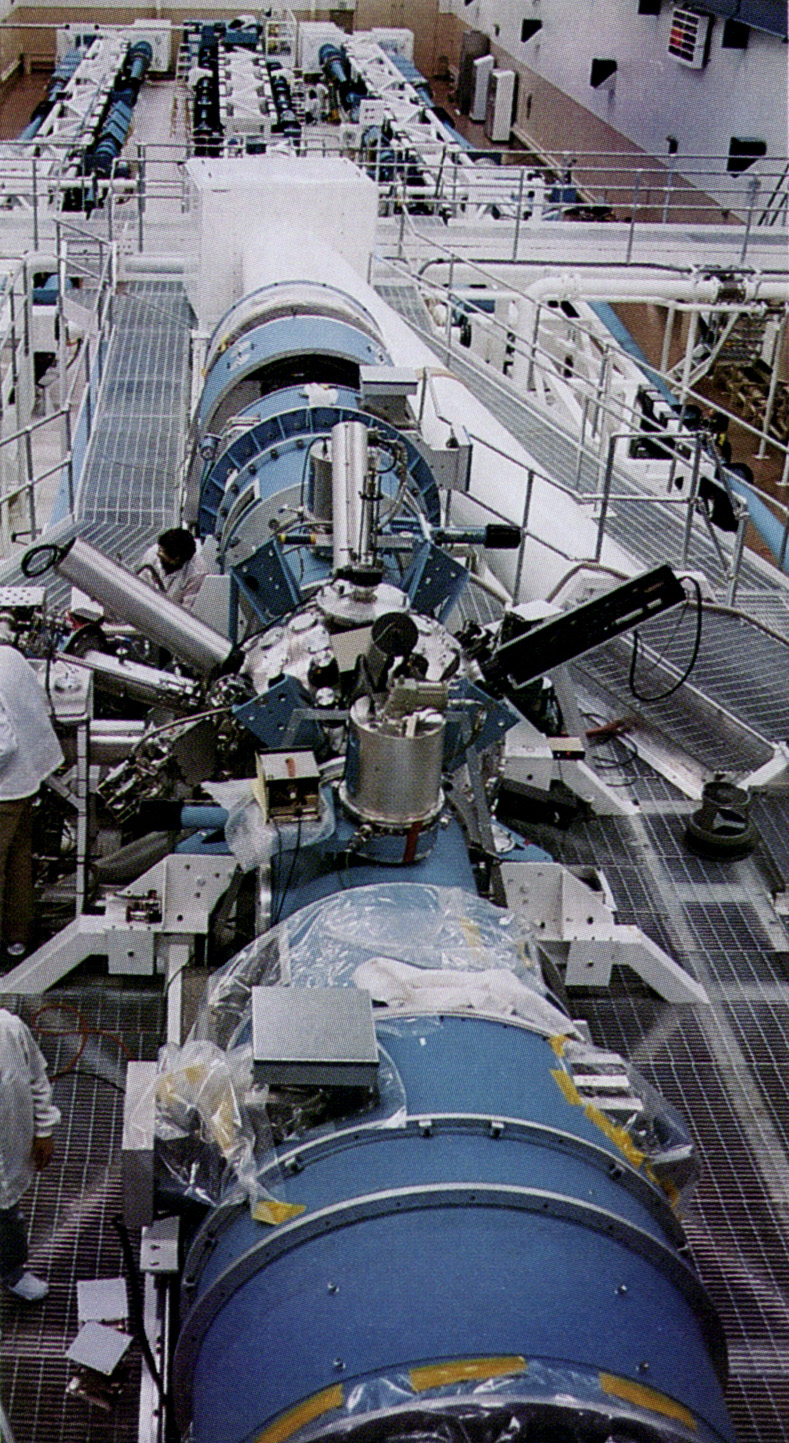
The Novette target chamber (metal sphere with diagnostic devices sticking out), which was reused from the Shiva project and two newly built laser chains visible in background.

Novette was a two beam neodymium glass (phosphate glass) testbed laser built at Lawrence Livermore National Laboratory in about 15 months throughout 1981 and 1982 and was completed in January 1983. Novette was made using recycled parts from the dismantled Shiva and Argus lasers and borrowed parts from the future Nova laser. Its main intended purpose was to validate the proposed design and expected performance of the then planned Nova laser. In addition to being used for the further study of enhanced laser to target plasma energy coupling utilizing frequency tripled light and examining its benefits with respect to inertial confinement fusion, Novette was also used in the world's first laboratory demonstration of an x-ray laser in 1984.

== See also ==
- List of laser articles
- List of laser types
