= ARC fusion reactor =

Theoretical design for a compact fusion reactor

The ARC fusion reactor (affordable, robust, compact) is a design for a compact 400 MW fusion reactor developed by the Massachusetts Institute of Technology (MIT) Plasma Science and Fusion Center (PSFC). ARC aims to achieve an engineering breakeven of three (to produce three times the electricity required to operate the machine). The key technical innovation is to use high-temperature superconducting magnets in place of ITER's low-temperature superconducting magnets. The proposed device would be about half the diameter of the ITER reactor and cheaper to build.

The ARC has a conventional advanced tokamak layout. ARC uses rare-earth barium copper oxide (REBCO) high-temperature superconductor magnets in place of copper wiring or conventional low-temperature superconductors. These magnets can be run at much higher field strengths, 23 T, roughly doubling the magnetic field on the plasma axis. The confinement time for a particle in plasma varies with the square of the linear size, and power density varies with the fourth power of the magnetic field, so doubling the magnetic field offers the performance of a machine 4 times larger. The smaller size reduces construction costs, although this is offset to some degree by the expense of the REBCO magnets.

The use of REBCO may allow the magnet windings to be flexible when the machine is not operational. This would allow them to be "folded open" to allow access to the interior of the machine. This would greatly lower maintenance costs, eliminating the need to perform maintenance through small access ports using remote manipulators. If realized, this could improve the reactor's capacity factor, an important metric in power generation costs.

The first machine planned to come from the project is a scaled-down demonstrator named SPARC (as Soon as Possible ARC). It is to be built by Commonwealth Fusion Systems, with backing led by Eni, Breakthrough Energy Ventures, Khosla Ventures, Temasek, and Equinor.

== History ==
The project was announced in 2014. The name and design were inspired by the fictional arc reactor built by Tony Stark, who attended MIT in the comic books.

The concept was born as "a project undertaken by a group of MIT students in a fusion design course". The ARC design was intended to show the capabilities of the new magnet technology by developing a design point for a plant producing as much fusion power as ITER at the smallest possible size. The result was a machine about half the linear dimension of ITER, running at 9 tesla and producing more than 500 megawatt (MW) of fusion power. The students also looked at technologies that would allow such a device to operate in steady state and produce more than 200 MW of electricity."

== Design features ==
The ARC design incorporates major departures from traditional tokamaks, while retaining conventional D–T (deuterium - tritium) fuel.

=== Magnetic field ===
To achieve a near tenfold increase in fusion power density, the design makes use of REBCO superconducting tape for its toroidal field coils. This material enables higher magnetic field strength to contain heated plasma in a smaller volume. In theory, fusion power density is proportional to the fourth power of the magnetic field strength. The most probable candidate material is yttrium barium copper oxide, with a design temperature of 20 K, allowing various coolants (e.g. liquid hydrogen, liquid neon, or helium gas) instead of the much more complicated liquid helium refrigeration chosen by ITER. The official SPARC brochure displays a YBCO cable section that is commercially available and that should allow fields up to 30 T.

ARC is planned to be a 270 MWe tokamak reactor with a major radius of 3.3 m, a minor radius of 1.1 m, and an on-axis magnetic field of 9.2 T.

The design point has a fusion energy gain factor Q_{p} ≈ 13.6 (the plasma produces 13 times more fusion energy than is required to heat it), yet is fully non-inductive, with a bootstrap fraction of ~63%.

The design is enabled by the ~23 T peak field on coil. External current drive is provided by two inboard RF launchers using 25 MW of lower hybrid and 13.6 MW of ion cyclotron fast wave power. The resulting current drive provides a steady-state core plasma far from disruptive limits.

=== Removable vacuum vessel ===
The design includes a removable vacuum vessel (the solid component that separates the plasma and the surrounding vacuum from the liquid blanket). It does not require dismantling the entire device. That makes it well-suited for evaluating design changes.

=== Liquid blanket ===
Most of the solid blanket materials that surround the fusion chamber in conventional designs are replaced by a fluorine lithium beryllium (FLiBe) molten salt that can easily be circulated/replaced, reducing maintenance costs.

The liquid blanket provides neutron moderation and shielding, heat removal, and a tritium breeding ratio ≥ 1.1. The large temperature range over which FLiBe is liquid permits blanket operation at 900 K with single-phase fluid cooling and a Brayton cycle.

== See also ==
- List of fusion experiments
