= HiPER =

Planned ICF powered by lasers

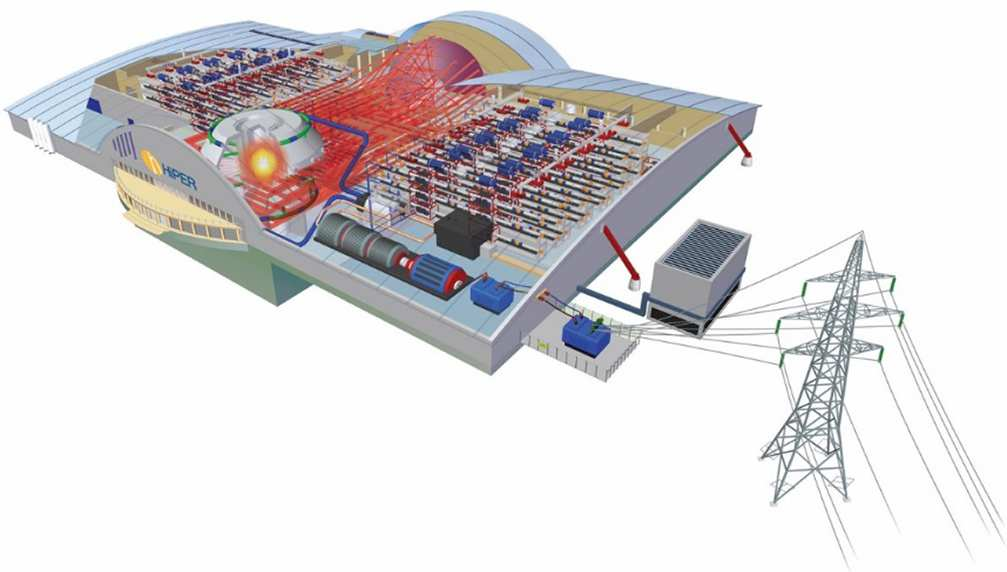
HiPER's layout from a preliminary design study.

The High Power laser Energy Research facility (HiPER), is a proposed experimental laser-driven inertial confinement fusion (ICF) device undergoing preliminary design for possible construction in the European Union. As of 2019, the effort appears to be inactive.

HiPER was designed to study the "fast ignition" approach to generating nuclear fusion, which uses much smaller lasers than conventional ICF designs, yet produces fusion power outputs of about the same magnitude. This offers a total "fusion gain" that is much higher than devices like the National Ignition Facility (NIF), and a reduction in construction costs of about ten times. This opened a window for a small machine to be rapidly built that would reach ignition before NIF. HiPER and the Japanese FIREX designs intended to explore this approach.

However, research into the fast ignition approach on smaller machines like the Omega laser in the US demonstrated a number of problems with the concept. Another alternative approach, shock ignition, began to take over future development starting around 2012. HiPER and FIREX both appear to have seen no additional development since that time.

HiPER should not be confused with an earlier ICF device in Japan known as "HIPER", which has not been operational for some time.

== Background ==
Inertial confinement fusion (ICF) devices use "drivers" to rapidly heat the outer layers of a "target" to compress it. The target is a small spherical pellet containing a few milligrams of fusion fuel, typically a mix of deuterium and tritium, or "D-T". The heat of the laser burns the surface of the pellet into a plasma, which explodes off the surface. The remaining portion of the target is driven inward due to Newton's third law, collapsing into a small point of very high density. The rapid blowoff also creates a shock wave that travels toward the center of the compressed fuel. When it reaches the center of the fuel and meets the shock from the other side of the target, the energy in the center further heats and compresses the tiny volume around it. If the temperature and density of that small spot can be raised high enough, fusion reactions will occur. This approach is now known as "hot-spot ignition" to distinguish it from new approaches.

The fusion reactions release high-energy particles, some of which (primarily alpha particles) collide with the high density fuel around it and slow down. This heats the surrounding fuel, and can potentially cause that fuel to undergo fusion as well. Given the right overall conditions of the compressed fuel – high enough density and temperature – this heating process can result in a chain reaction, burning outward from the center. This is a condition known as "ignition", which can lead to a significant portion of the fuel in the target undergoing fusion, and the release of significant amounts of energy.

To date most ICF experiments have used lasers to heat the targets. Calculations show that the energy must be delivered quickly to compress the core before it disassembles, as well as creating a suitable shock wave. The energy must also be focused extremely evenly across the target's outer surface to collapse the fuel into a symmetric core. Although other drivers have been suggested, notably heavy ions driven in particle accelerators, lasers are currently the only devices with the right combination of features.

== Description ==
In the case of HiPER, the driver laser system is similar to existing systems like NIF, but considerably smaller and less powerful.

The driver consists of a number of "beamlines" containing Nd:glass laser amplifiers at one end of the building. Just prior to firing, the glass is "pumped" to a high-energy state with a series of xenon flash tubes, causing a population inversion of the neodymium (Nd) atoms in the glass. This readies them for amplification via stimulated emission when a small amount of laser light, generated externally in a fibre optic, is fed into the beamlines. The glass is not particularly effective at transferring power into the beam, so to get as much power as possible back out, the beam is reflected through the glass four times in a mirrored cavity, each time gaining more power. When this process is complete, a Pockels cell switches the light out of the cavity. One problem for the HiPER project is that Nd:glass is no longer being produced commercially, so a number of options need to be studied to ensure supply of the estimated 1,300 disks.

From there, the laser light is fed into a very long spatial filter to clean up the resulting pulse. The filter is essentially a telescope that focuses the beam into a spot some distance away, where a small pinhole located at the focal point cuts off any "stray" light caused by inhomogeneities in the laser beam. The beam then widens out until a second lens returns it to a straight beam again. It is the use of spatial filters that lead to the long beamlines seen in ICF laser devices. In the case of HiPER, the filters take up about 50% of the overall length. The beam width at exit of the driver system is about 40 cm × 40 cm.

One of the problems encountered in previous experiments, notably the Shiva laser, was that the infrared light provided by the Nd:glass lasers (at ~1054 nm in vaco) couples strongly with the electrons around the target, losing a considerable amount of energy that would otherwise heat the target itself. This is typically addressed through the use of an optical frequency multiplier, which can double or triple the frequency of the light, into the green or ultraviolet, respectively. These higher frequencies interact less strongly with the electrons, putting more power into the target. HiPER will use frequency tripling on the drivers.

When the amplification process is complete the laser light enters the experimental chamber, lying at one end of the building. Here it is reflected off a series of deformable mirrors that help correct remaining imperfections in the wavefront, and then feeds them into the target chamber from all angles. Since the overall distances from the ends of the beamlines to different points on the target chamber are different, delays are introduced on the individual paths to ensure they all reach the center of the chamber at the same time, within about 10 picoseconds (ps). The target, a fusion fuel pellet about 1 mm in diameter in the case of HiPER, lies at the center of the chamber.

HiPER differs from most ICF devices in that it also includes a second set of lasers for directly heating the compressed fuel. The heating pulse needs to be very short, about 10 to 20 ps long, but this is too short a time for the amplifiers to work well. To solve this problem HiPER uses a technique known as chirped pulse amplification (CPA). CPA starts with a short pulse from a wide-bandwidth (multi-frequency) laser source, as opposed to the driver which uses a monochromatic (single-frequency) source. Light from this initial pulse is split into different colours using a pair of diffraction gratings and optical delays. This "stretches" the pulse into a chain several nanoseconds long. The pulse is then sent into the amplifiers as normal. When it exits the beamlines it is recombined in a similar set of gratings to produce a single very short pulse, but because the pulse now has very high power, the gratings have to be large (approx 1 m) and sit in a vacuum. Additionally the individual beams must be lower in power overall; the compression side of the system uses 40 beamlines of about 5 kJ each to generate a total of 200 kJ, whereas the ignition side requires 24 beamlines of just under 3 kJ to generate a total of 70 kJ. The precise number and power of the beamlines are currently a subject of research. Frequency multiplication will also be used on the heaters, but it has not yet been decided whether to use doubling or tripling; the latter puts more power into the target, but is less efficient converting the light. As of 2007, the baseline design is based on doubling into the green.

== Fast Ignition and HiPER ==
In traditional ICF devices the driver laser is used to compress the target to very high densities. The shock wave created by this process further heats the compressed fuel when it collides in the center of the sphere. If the compression is symmetrical enough the increase in temperature can create conditions close to the Lawson criterion and lead to ignition.

The amount of laser energy needed to effectively compress the targets to ignition conditions has grown rapidly from early estimates. In the "early days" of ICF research in the 1970s it was believed that as little as 1 kilojoules (kJ) would suffice, and a number of experimental lasers were built to reach these power levels. When they did, a series of problems, typically related to the homogeneity of the collapse, turned out to seriously disrupt the implosion symmetry and lead to much cooler core temperatures than originally expected. Through the 1980s the estimated energy required to reach ignition grew into the megajoule range, which appeared to make ICF impractical for fusion energy production. For instance, the National Ignition Facility (NIF) uses about 420 MJ of electrical power to pump the driver lasers, and in the best case is expected to produce about 20 MJ of fusion power output. Without dramatic gains in output, such a device would never be a practical energy source.

The fast ignition approach attempts to avoid these problems. Instead of using the shock wave to create the conditions needed for fusion above the ignition range, this approach directly heats the fuel. This is far more efficient than the shock wave, which becomes less important. In HiPER, the compression provided by the driver is "good", but not nearly that created by larger devices like NIF; HiPER's driver is about 200 kJ and produces densities of about 300 g/cm^{3}. That's about one-third that of NIF, and about the same as generated by the earlier NOVA laser of the 1980s. For comparison, lead is about 11 g/cm^{3}, so this still represents a considerable amount of compression, notably when one considers the target's interior contained light D-T fuel around 0.1 g/cm^{3}.

Ignition is started by a very-short (~10 picoseconds) ultra-high-power (~70 kJ, 4 PW) laser pulse, aimed through a hole in the plasma at the core. The light from this pulse interacts with the cool surrounding fuel, generating a shower of high-energy (3.5 MeV) relativistic electrons that are driven into the fuel. The electrons heat a spot on one side of the dense core, and if this heating is localised enough it is expected to drive the area well beyond ignition energies.

The overall efficiency of this approach is many times that of the conventional approach. In the case of NIF the laser generates about 4 MJ of infrared power to create ignition that releases about 20 MJ of energy. This corresponds to a "fusion gain" —the ratio of input laser power to output fusion power— of about 5. If one uses the baseline assumptions for the current HiPER design, the two lasers (driver and heater) produce about 270 kJ in total, yet generate 25 to 30 MJ, a gain of about 100. Considering a variety of losses, the actual gain is predicted to be around 72. Not only does this outperform NIF by a wide margin, the smaller lasers are much less expensive to build. In terms of power-for-cost, HiPER is expected to be about an order of magnitude less expensive than conventional devices like NIF.

Compression is already a fairly well-understood problem, and HiPER is primarily interested in exploring the precise physics of the rapid heating process. It is not clear how quickly the electrons stop in the fuel load; while this is known for matter under normal pressures, it's not for the ultra-dense conditions of the compressed fuel. To work efficiently, the electrons should stop in as short a distance as possible, to release their energy into a small spot and thus raise the temperature (energy per unit volume) as high as possible.

How to get the laser light onto that spot is also a matter for further research. One approach uses a short pulse from another laser to heat the plasma outside the dense "core", essentially burning a hole through it and exposing the dense fuel inside. This approach will be tested on the OMEGA-EP system in the US. Another approach, tested successfully on the GEKKO XII laser in Japan, uses a small gold cone that cuts through a small area of the target shell; on heating no plasma is created in this area, leaving a hole that can be aimed into by shining the laser into the inner surface of the cone. HiPER is currently planning on using the gold cone approach, but will likely study the burning solution as well.

== Related research ==
In 2005 HiPER completed a preliminary study outlining possible approaches and arguments for its construction. The report received positive reviews from the EC in July 2007, and moved onto a preparatory design phase in early 2008 with detailed designs for construction beginning in 2011 or 2012.

In parallel, the HiPER project also proposes to build smaller laser systems with higher repetition rates. The high-powered flash lamps used to pump the laser amplifier glass causes it to deform, and it cannot be fired again until it cools off, which takes as long as a day. Additionally only a very small amount of the flash of white light generated by the tubes is of the right frequency to be absorbed by the Nd:glass and thus lead to amplification, in general only about 1 to 1.5% of the energy fed into the tubes ends up in the laser beam.

Key to avoiding these problems is replacing the flash lamps with more efficient pumps, typically based on laser diodes. These are far more efficient at generating light from electricity, and thus run much cooler. More importantly, the light they do generate is fairly monochromatic and can be tuned to frequencies that can be easily absorbed. This means that much less power needs to be used to produce any particular amount of laser light, further reducing the overall amount of heat being generated. The improvement in efficiency can be dramatic; existing experimental devices operate at about 10% overall efficiency, and it is believed "near term" devices will improve this as high as 20%.

== Current status ==
Further research in the fast ignition approach cast serious doubt on its future. By 2013, the US National Academy of Sciences concluded that it was no longer a worthwhile research direction, stating "At this time, fast ignition appears to be a less promising approach for IFE than other ignition concepts."

== See also ==
- Laser Mégajoule

== Bibliography ==
- Mike Dunne et al., "HiPER Technical Background and Conceptual Design Report 2007", June 2007
- Mike Dunne et al., "HiPER: a laser fusion facility for Europe", 2005
- Edwin Cartlidge, "Europe plans laser-fusion facility", Physics World, 2 September 2005
- Gerstner, Ed (2007), "Laser physics: Extreme light", Nature, 446 (7131): 16–18, Bibcode:2007Natur.446...16G, doi:10.1038/446016a, PMID 17330018, S2CID 4388058
