= Long path laser =

Infrared laser

The Long Path laser was an early high energy infrared laser at the Lawrence Livermore National Laboratory used to study inertial confinement fusion. Long path was completed in 1972 and was the first ICF laser ever to use neodymium doped glass as the lasing medium. It was capable of delivering about 50 joules of light at 1,062 nm onto a target in ~10 ns pulses. It did not use spatial filters to smooth the beam after amplification stages and thus had a fairly poor beam quality. Long path was mostly used to investigate laser energy absorption in deuterated plastic targets.

== See also ==
- Laser
- Lawrence Livermore National Laboratory
- List of laser articles
- List of laser types
