= Inertial confinement fusion =

Branch of fusion energy research

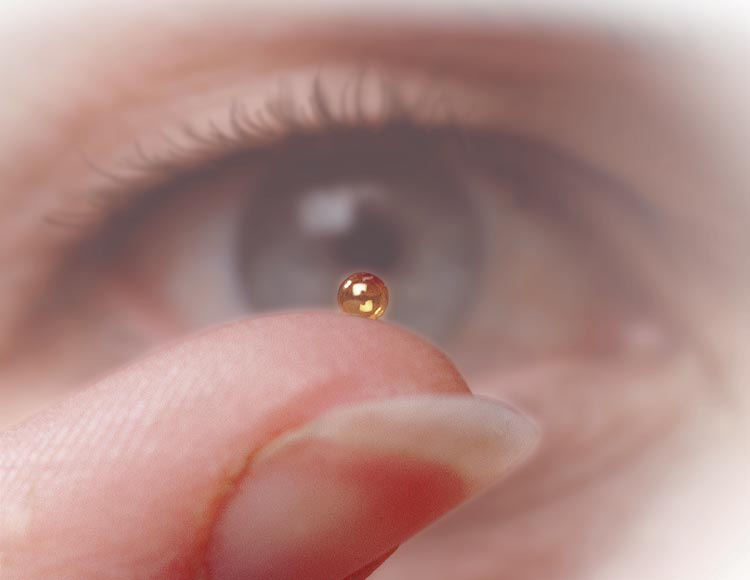
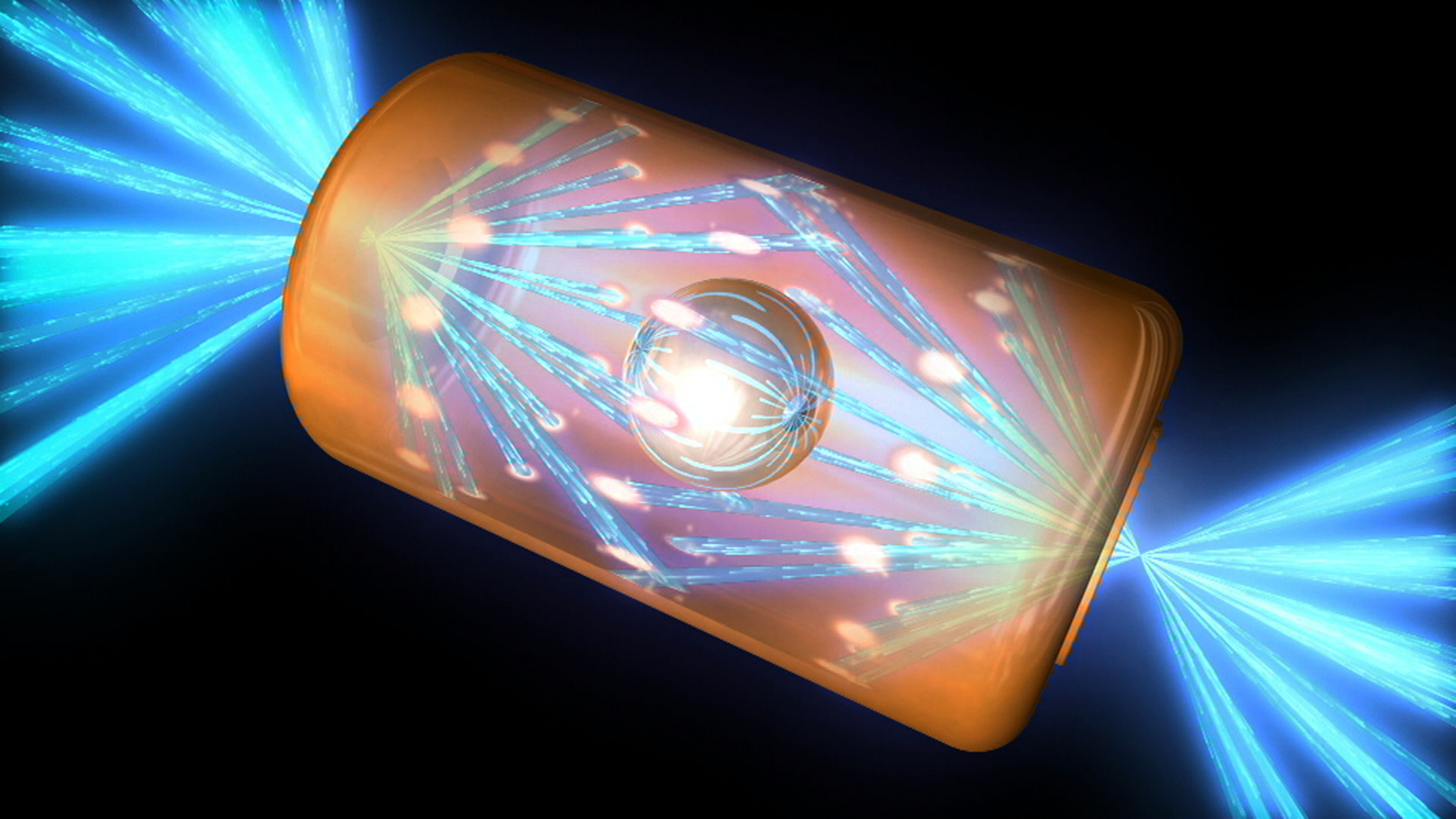
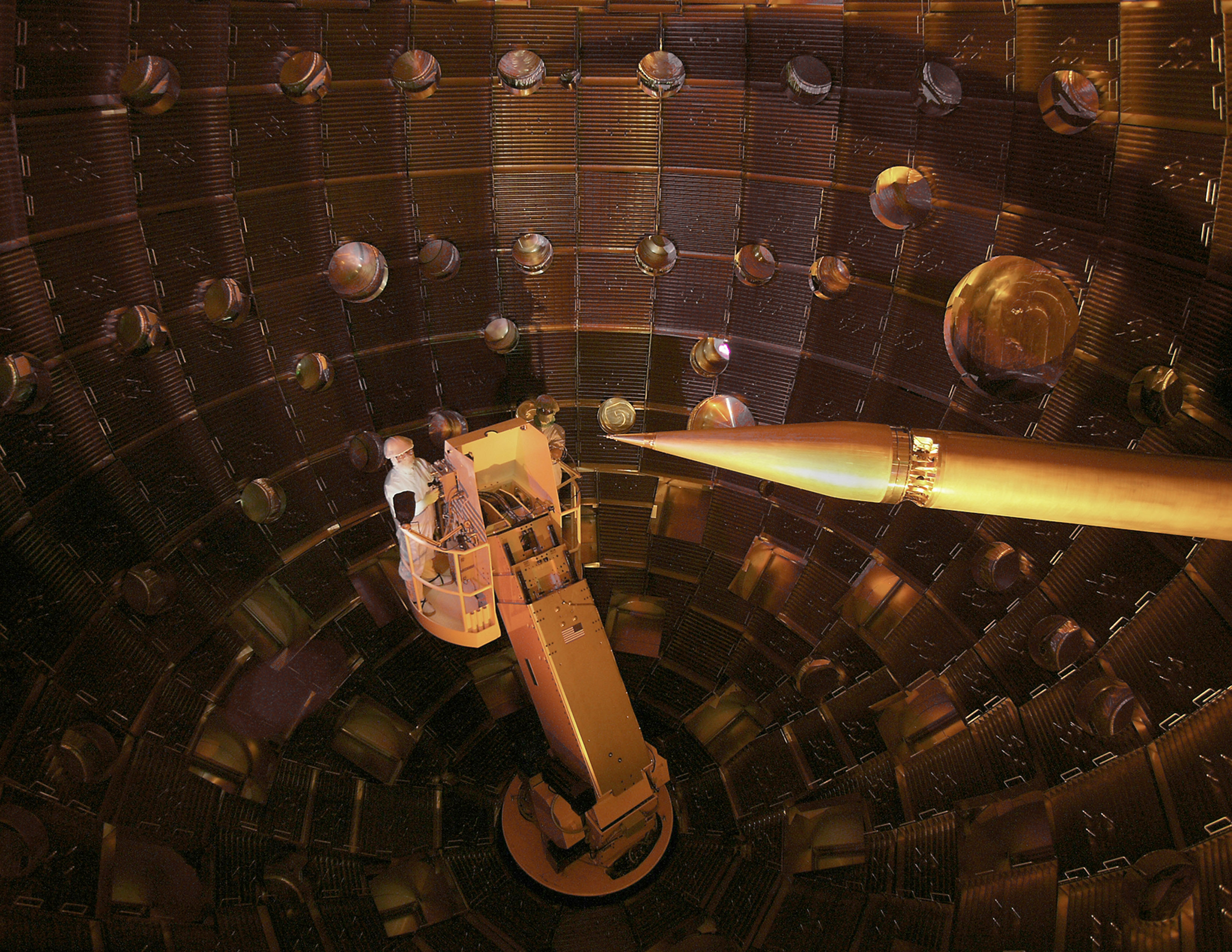
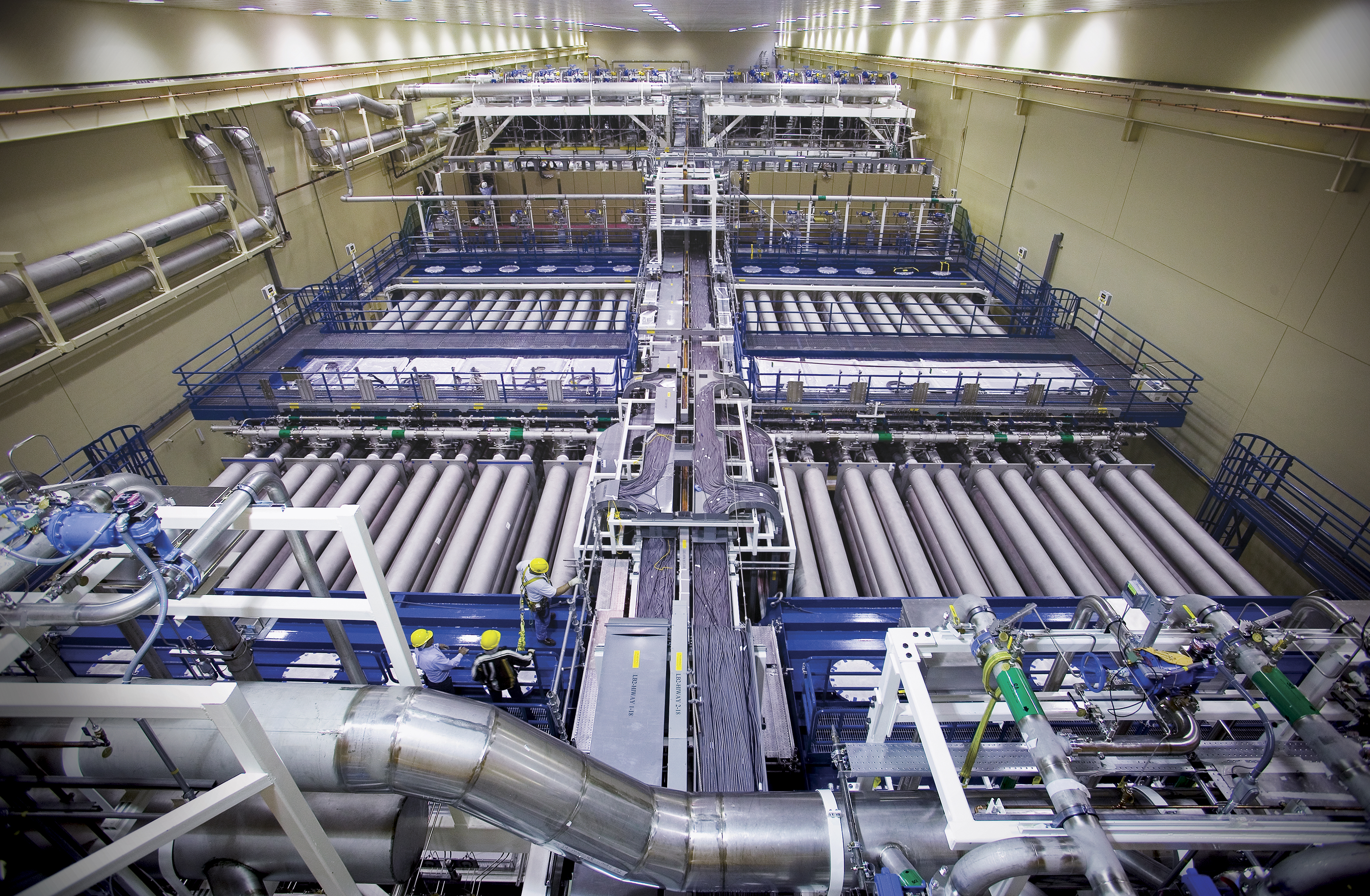
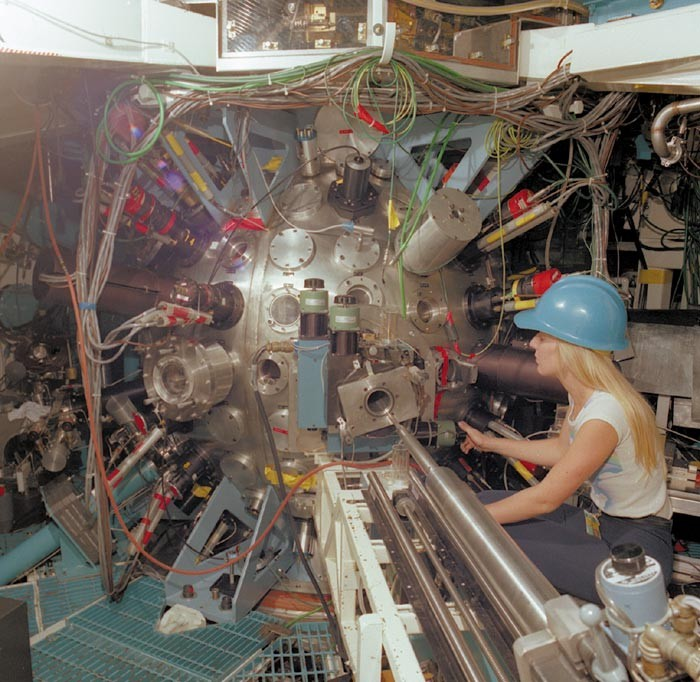
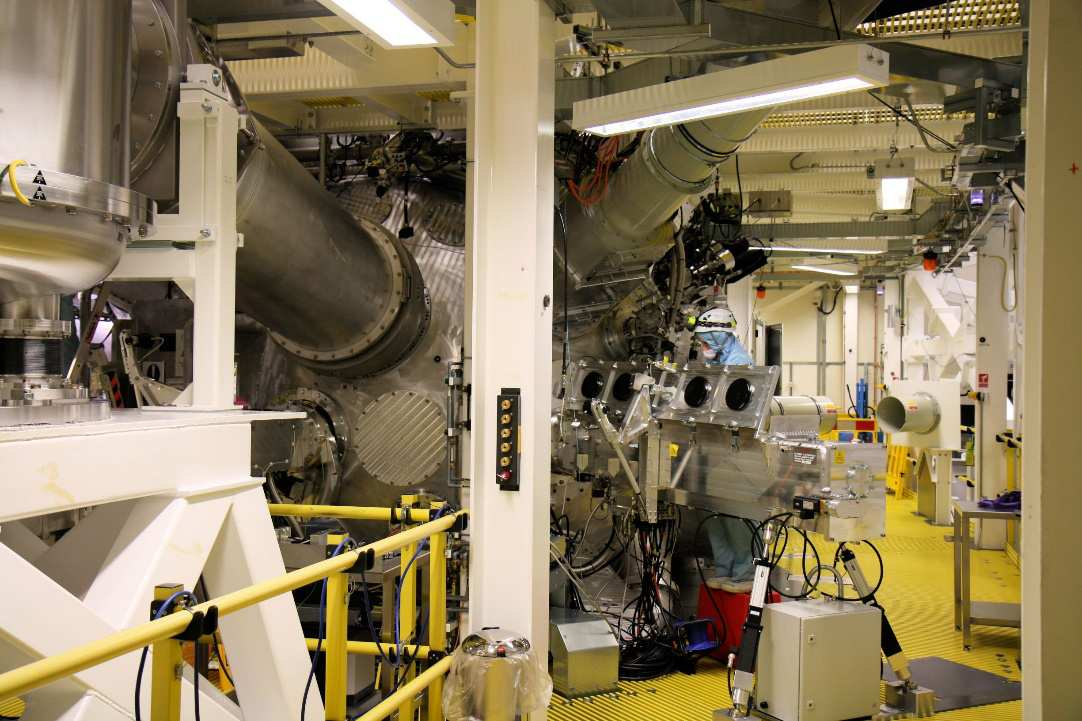
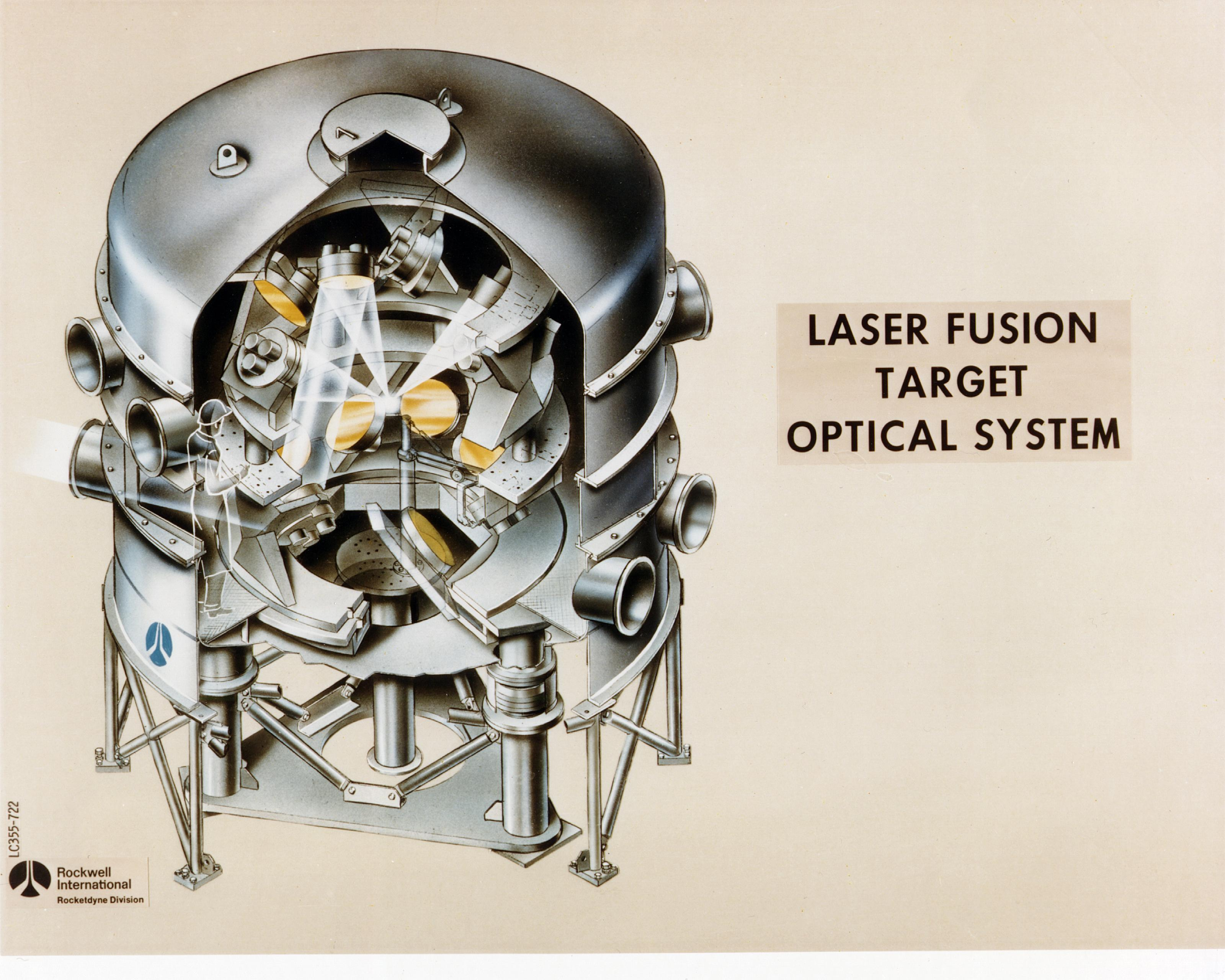
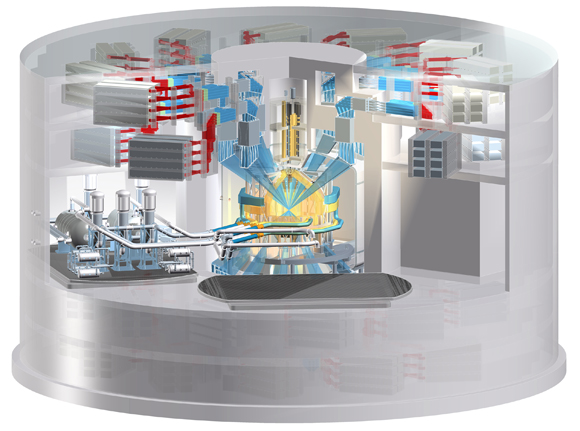
From top, left to right
1. A deuterium-tritium target pellet
2. A depiction of the hohlraum absorbing lasers and emitting X-rays
3. The target chamber interior of the National Ignition Facility, US
4. The NIF laser bay
5. The target chamber of Shiva at LLNL, US
6. The target chamber of Orion, UK
7. Diagram of Helios, an early LANL experiment
8. Diagram of LIFE, an LLNL ICF power plant concept

Inertial confinement fusion (ICF) is a fusion energy process that initiates nuclear fusion reactions by compressing and heating targets filled with fuel. The targets are small pellets, typically containing deuterium (^{2}H) and tritium (^{3}H).

Typically, short pulse lasers deposit energy on a hohlraum. Its inner surface vaporizes, releasing X-rays. These converge on the pellet's exterior, turning it into a plasma. This produces a reaction force in the form of shock waves that travel through the target. The waves compress and heat it. Sufficiently powerful shock waves achieve the Lawson criterion for fusion of the fuel.

ICF is one of two major branches of fusion research; the other is magnetic confinement fusion (MCF). When first proposed in the early 1970s, ICF appeared to be a practical approach to power production and the field flourished. Experiments demonstrated that the efficiency of these devices was much lower than expected. Throughout the 1980s and '90s, experiments were conducted in order to understand the interaction of high-intensity laser light and plasma. These led to the design of much larger machines that achieved ignition-generating energies. Nonetheless, MCF currently dominates power-generation approaches.

Unlike MCF, ICF has direct dual-use applications to the study of thermonuclear weapon detonation. For nuclear states, ICF forms a component of stockpile stewardship. This allows the allocation of not only scientific but military funding.

California's Lawrence Livermore National Laboratory has dominated ICF history, and operates the largest ICF experiment, the National Ignition Facility (NIF). In 2022, an NIF deuterium-tritium shot yielded 3.15 megajoules (MJ) from a delivered energy of 2.05 MJ, the first time that any fusion device produced an energy gain factor above one.

== Description ==
=== Fusion basics ===
Fusion reactions combine smaller atoms to form larger ones. This occurs when two atoms (or ions, atoms stripped of their electrons) come close enough to each other that the nuclear force dominates the electrostatic force that otherwise keeps them apart. Overcoming electrostatic repulsion requires kinetic energy sufficient to overcome the Coulomb barrier or fusion barrier.

Less energy is needed to cause lighter nuclei to fuse, as they have less electrical charge and thus a lower barrier energy. Thus the barrier is lowest for hydrogen. Conversely, the nuclear force increases with the number of nucleons, so isotopes of hydrogen that contain additional neutrons reduce the required energy. The easiest fuel is a mixture of ^{2}H, and ^{3}H, known as D-T.

The odds of fusion occurring are a function of the fuel density and temperature and the length of time that the density and temperature are maintained. Even under ideal conditions, the chance that a D and T pair fuse is very small. Higher density and longer times allow more encounters among the atoms. This cross section is further dependent on individual ion energies. This combination, the fusion triple product, must reach the Lawson criterion, to reach ignition.

=== Thermonuclear devices ===
The first ICF devices were the hydrogen bombs invented in the early 1950s. A hydrogen bomb consists of two bombs in a single case. The first, the primary stage, is a fission-powered device normally using plutonium. When it explodes it gives off a burst of thermal X-rays that fill the interior of the bomb casing. These X-rays are absorbed by a special material (like Fogbank) surrounding the secondary stage, which consists of fusion fuel, sandwiched between a fission fuel sparkplug and tamper. The X-rays heat this secondary and initiate further fission. Due to Newton's third law, this causes the fuel inside to be driven inward, compressing and heating it. This causes the fusion fuel to reach the temperature and density where fusion reactions begin.

In the case of D-T fuel, most of the energy is released in the form of alpha particles and neutrons. Under normal conditions, an alpha can travel about 10 mm through the fuel, but in the ultra-dense conditions in the compressed fuel, they can travel about 0.01 mm before their electrical charge, interacting with the surrounding plasma, causes them to lose their speed. This means the majority of the energy released by the alphas is redeposited in the fuel. This transfer of kinetic energy heats the surrounding particles to the energies they need to undergo fusion. This process causes the fusion fuel to burn outward from the center. The electrically neutral neutrons travel longer distances in the fuel mass and do not contribute to this self-heating process. In a bomb, they are instead used to either breed tritium through reactions in a lithium-deuteride fuel, or are used to split additional fissionable fuel surrounding the secondary stage, often part of the bomb casing.

The requirement that the reaction has to be sparked by a fission bomb makes this method impractical for power generation. Not only would the fission triggers be expensive to produce, but the minimum size of such a bomb is large, defined roughly by the critical mass of the plutonium fuel used. Generally, it seems difficult to build efficient nuclear fission devices much smaller than about 1 kiloton in yield, and the fusion secondary would add to this yield. This makes it a difficult engineering problem to extract power from the resulting explosions. Project PACER studied solutions to the engineering issues, but also demonstrated that it was not economically feasible. The cost of the bombs was far greater than the value of the resulting electricity.

=== Mechanism of action ===
The energy needed to overcome the Coulomb barrier corresponds to the energy of the average particle in a gas heated to 100 million K. The specific heat of hydrogen is about 14 Joule per gram-K, so considering a 1 milligram fuel pellet, the energy needed to raise the mass as a whole to this temperature is 1.4 megajoules (MJ).

In the more widely developed magnetic fusion energy (MFE) approach, confinement times are on the order of one second. However, plasmas can be sustained for minutes. In this case the confinement time represents the amount of time it takes for the energy from the reaction to be lost to the environment - through a variety of mechanisms. For a one-second confinement, the density needed to meet the Lawson criterion is about 10^{14} particles per cubic centimetre (cc). For comparison, air at sea level has about 2.7 × 10^{19} particles/cc, so the MFE approach has been described as "a good vacuum".

Considering a 1 milligram drop of D-T fuel in liquid form, the size is about 1 mm and the density is about 4 × 10^{20}/cc. Nothing holds the fuel together. Heat created by fusion events causes it to expand at the speed of sound, which leads to a confinement time around 2 × 10^{−10} seconds. At liquid density the required confinement time is about 2 × 10^{−7}s. In this case only about 0.1 percent of the fuel fuses before the drop blows apart.

The rate of fusion reactions is a function of density, and density can be improved through compression. If the drop is compressed from 1 mm to 0.1 mm in diameter, the confinement time drops by the same factor of 10, because the particles have less distance to travel before they escape. However, the density, which is the cube of the dimensions, increases by 1,000 times. This means the overall rate of fusion increases 1,000 times while the confinement drops by 10 times, a 100-fold improvement. In this case 10% of the fuel undergoes fusion; 10% of 1 mg of fuel produces about 30 MJ of energy, 30 times the amount needed to compress it to that density.

The other key concept in ICF is that the entire fuel mass does not have to be raised to 100 million K. In a fusion bomb the reaction continues because the alpha particles released in the interior heat the fuel around it. At liquid density the alphas travel about 10 mm and thus their energy escapes the fuel. In the 0.1 mm compressed fuel, the alphas have a range of about 0.016 mm, meaning that they will stop within the fuel and heat it. In this case a "propagating burn" can be caused by heating only the center of the fuel to the needed temperature. This requires far less energy; calculations suggested 1 kJ is enough to reach the compression goal.

Some method is needed to heat the interior to fusion temperatures, and do so while when the fuel is compressed and the density is high enough. In modern ICF devices, the density of the compressed fuel mixture is as much as one-thousand times the density of water, or one-hundred times that of lead, around 1000 g/cm^{3}. Much of the work since the 1970s has been on ways to create the central hot-spot that starts off the burning, and dealing with the many practical problems in reaching the desired density.

Schematic of the stages of inertial confinement fusion using lasers. The blue arrows represent radiation; orange is blowoff; purple is inwardly transported thermal energy.: 1. Laser beams or laser-produced X-rays rapidly heat the surface of the fusion target, forming a surrounding plasma envelope.; 2. Fuel is compressed by the rocket-like blowoff of the hot surface material.; 3. During the final part of the capsule implosion, the fuel core reaches 20 times the density of lead and ignites at 100,000,000 ˚C.; 4. Thermonuclear burn spreads rapidly through the compressed fuel, yielding many times the input energy.

=== Heating concepts ===
Early calculations suggested that the amount of energy needed to ignite the fuel was very small, but this does not match subsequent experience.

==== Hot spot ignition ====
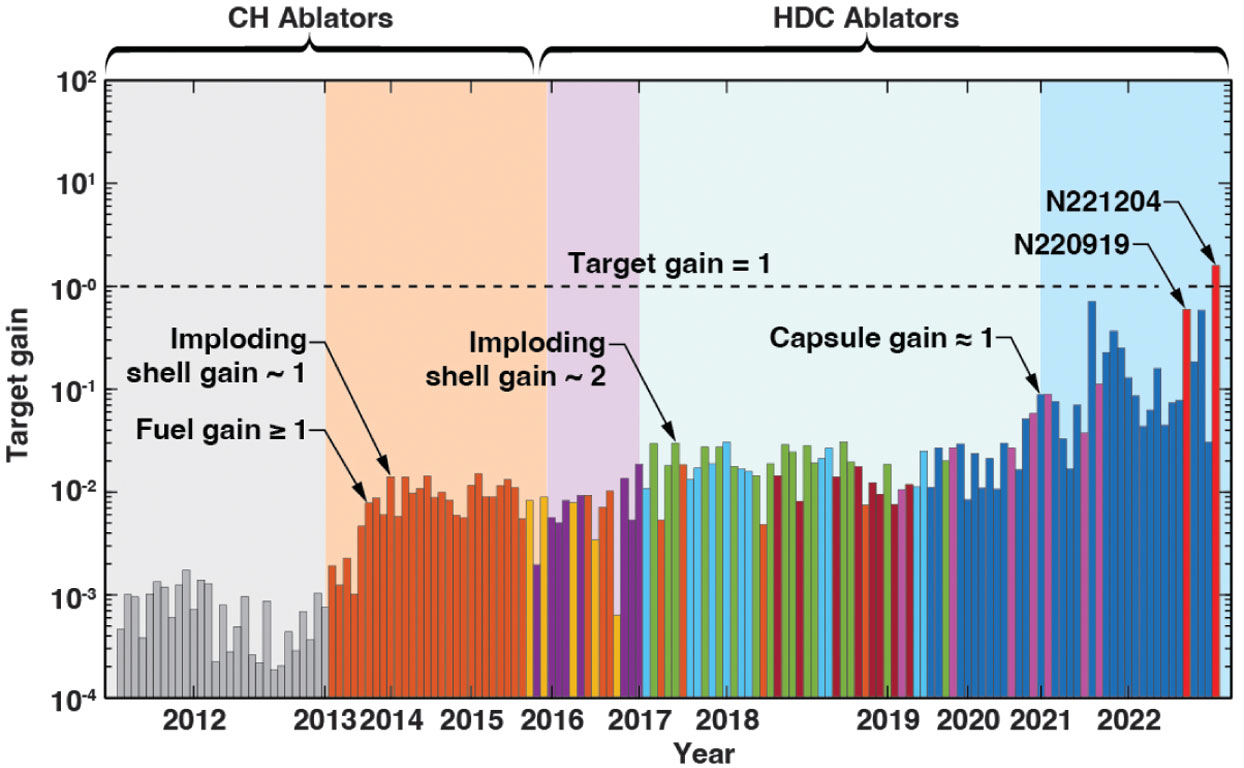
Plot of NIF target gain from 2012 to 2022, on a logarithmic scale. Note the 10× increase in gain in 2021 due to the achievement of ignition, followed by the achievement of target gain greater than 1 in 2022.

The initial solution to the heating problem involved deliberate "shaping" of the energy delivery. The idea was to use an initial lower-energy pulse to vaporize the capsule and cause compression, and then a very short, very powerful pulse near the end of the compression cycle. The goal is to launch shock waves into the compressed fuel that travel inward to the center. When they reach the center they meet the waves coming in from other sides. This causes a brief period where the density in the center reaches much higher values, over 800 g/cm^{3}.

The central hot spot ignition concept was the first to suggest ICF was not only a practical route to fusion, but relatively simple. This led to numerous efforts to build working systems in the early 1970s. These experiments revealed unexpected loss mechanisms. Early calculations suggested about 4.5 × 10^{7} J/g would be needed, but modern calculations place it closer to 10^{8} J/g. Greater understanding led to complex shaping of the pulse into multiple time intervals.

=== Direct vs. indirect drive ===
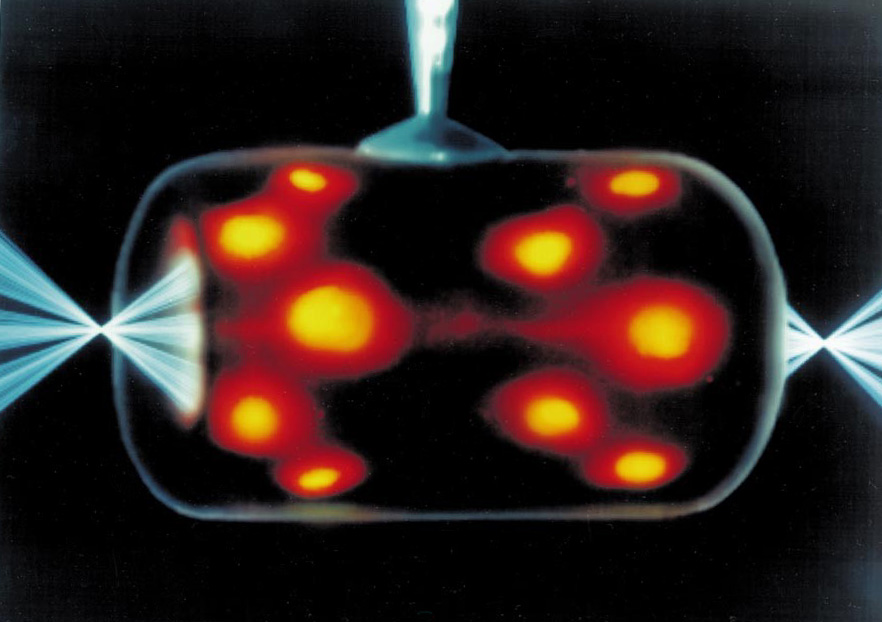
Indirect drive laser ICF uses a hohlraum which is irradiated with laser beam cones from either side on its inner surface to bathe a fusion microcapsule inside with smooth high intensity X-rays. The highest energy X-rays can be seen leaking through the hohlraum, represented here in orange/red.

In the simplest method of inertial confinement, the fuel is arranged as a sphere. This allows it to be compressed uniformly from all sides. To produce the inward force, the fuel is placed within a thin capsule that absorbs energy from the driver beams, causing the capsule shell to explode outward. The capsule shell is usually made of a lightweight plastic fabricated using plasma polymerization, and the fuel is deposited as a layer on the inside by injecting or diffusing the gaseous fuel into the shell and then freezing it.

Shining the driver beams directly onto the fuel capsule is known as "direct drive". The implosion process must be extremely uniform in order to avoid asymmetry due to Rayleigh–Taylor instability and similar effects. For a beam energy of 1 MJ, the fuel capsule cannot be larger than about 2 mm before these effects disrupt the implosion symmetry. This limits the size of the laser beams to a diameter so narrow that it is difficult to achieve in practice.

On the other hand, "indirect drive" illuminates a small cylinder of heavy metal, often gold or lead, known as a hohlraum. The beam energy heats the hohlraum until it emits X-rays. These X-rays fill the interior of the hohlraum and heat the capsule. The advantage of indirect drive is that the beams can be larger and less accurate. The disadvantage is that much of the delivered energy is used to heat the hohlraum until it is "X-ray hot", so the end-to-end energy efficiency is much lower than the direct drive method.

Within the direct inertial confinement fusion scheme, there are two alternative approaches: shock ignition and fast ignition. In both cases the compression and heating processes are separated. First, a set of driver lasers compress the fuel up to an optimal point were the plasma is condensed and found in a stagnation state, this is, it has approximately homogenous temperature and density at its core. Then, another mechanism heats the plasma up to fusion conditions.

==== Shock ignition ====
Proposed by C. Zhou and R. Betti, after an early compression phase similar to that of the direct drive approach, an additional driver is applied (such as a laser, electron beam, or similar pulse). This create a shock wave orders of magnitude stronger. The separation of the compression process from the final heating, where ignition is achieved, offers the advantage of reducing the compression requirements and utilizing more efficient energy deposition mechanisms. Additionally, some theoretical and experimental findings claim that these approach enhances ignition conditions, as demonstrated, for instance, at the OMEGA laser at the University of Rochester. This increases the efficiency of the process while lowering the overall amount of power required.

==== Fast ignition ====
Fast ignition is a promising alternative for achieving nuclear fusion within the inertial confinement fusion scheme. Similar to the shock ignition scheme, fast ignition divides the fusion process into two distinct steps: compression and heating, each of which can be optimized independently. After the precompression phase, a powerful particle beam is used to provide additional energy directly to the core of the fuel. In fast ignition, this relies on a separate and rapid heating pulse, while shock ignition primarily employs shock waves to achieve ignition. The beam applied creates a heated volume within the plasma. If any region of such volume is able to ignite the nuclear fusion process, then, the burning will start and spread to the rest of the fuel.

The two types of fast ignition are the "plasma bore-through" method and the "cone-in-shell" method. In plasma bore-through, a preceding laser bores through the outer plasma of the imploding capsule (the corona), before the last beam shot. In the cone-in-shell method, the capsule is mounted on the end of a small high-z (high atomic number) cone such that the tip of the cone projects into the core. In this second method, when the capsule is imploded, the beam has a clear view of the core and does not use energy to bore through the 'corona' plasma. However, the presence of the cone affects the implosion process in significant ways that are not fully understood. In tests, this approach presents difficulties, because the laser pulse had to reach the center at a precise moment, while the center is obscured by debris and free electrons from the compression pulse. A variation of this cone approach incorporates a small pellet of fuel at the apex of the device, initiating a preliminary pre-explosion that also moves inward towards the larger fuel mass.

Regarding the power beam, the original proposal for fast ignition involved an electron-based scheme. However, it was limited by the high electron divergences, kinetic energy constraints and sensitivity. Meanwhile, fast ignition by laser-driven ion beams, offers a much more localized energy deposition, a stiffer ion transport, with the possibility of beam focusing, and a better understood and controlled ion-plasma interaction. At first, the proposed projectiles of the beam were light ions, such as protons. However, these ions deposit most of their energy at the edge of the fuel, resulting in an asymmetrical geometry of the heated plasma. Later, heavier projectiles were suggested. Their interaction with the plasma is semi-transparent at the edge, allowing for deposition of most of their energy in the centre of the fuel, which optimises a symmetrical propagation and explosion. The ion beam used for the final ignition can be optimized, in order to achieve the desired conditions for the plasma and the burning, and to reduce system requirements.

Currently, several research facilities worldwide are actively experimenting with Fast Ignition nuclear fusion, notably: the High Power Laser Energy Research Facility (HiPer), located across multiple institutions in Europe. HiPer is a proposed £500 million facility by the European Union. Compared to NIF's 2 MJ UV beams, HiPER's driver was planned to be 200 kJ and heater 70 kJ, although the predicted fusion gains are higher than NIF. It was to employ diode lasers, which convert electricity into laser light with much higher efficiency and run cooler. This allows them to operate at much higher frequencies. HiPER proposed to operate at 1 MJ at 1 Hz, or alternately 100 kJ at 10 Hz. The project's final update was in 2014. It was expected to offer a higher Q with a 10x reduction in construction costs times. Several other projects are currently underway to explore fast ignition, including upgrades to the OMEGA laser at the Laboratory for Laser Energetics (LLE) in the University of Rochester and the GEKKO XII device at the Institute of Laser Engineering (ILE) in Osaka, Japan. Nonetheless, fast ignition faces its particular challenges, such as achieving an optimal deposition of energy in the target, avoiding unnecessary losses and properly transporting the fast electrons or ions through the plasma without creating divergences or instabilities.

=== Polymer fuel capsule fabrication ===
For fuel capsules constructed using glow-discharge polymer (GDP) via plasma polymerization, outer diameters can range from 900 μm (typical for the OMEGA laser system at the Laboratory for Laser Energetics) to 2mm (typical for the NIF laser at the Lawrence Livermore National Laboratory. The process for producing GDP capsules begins with a bubble of poly(α-methylstyrene) (PAMS) that serves as a decomposable mandrel. Next, the bubble is coated with GDP to the desired thickness. Finally, the coated bubble is heated in an inert atmosphere. Upon reaching 300 °C, the PAMS bubble decomposes into its monomers and diffuses out of the coating, leaving only a hollow sphere of the GDP coating.

GDP lends itself to inertial fusion capsules—especially those used in direct-drive configurations—due to its ability to create low-defect, uniform thin films that are permeable to deuterium and tritium fuel. Permeating the fuel into the capsule precludes the need for drilling into the capsule to facilitate fuel injection, reducing the overall fusion target complexity and asymmetry. The rigorous uniformity and sphericity requirements of direct drive fusion experiments result in GDP being favored over other capsule materials. Additionally, the GDP layers can be doped with different elements to provide diagnostic signals or prevent preheating of the fuel.

=== Challenges ===
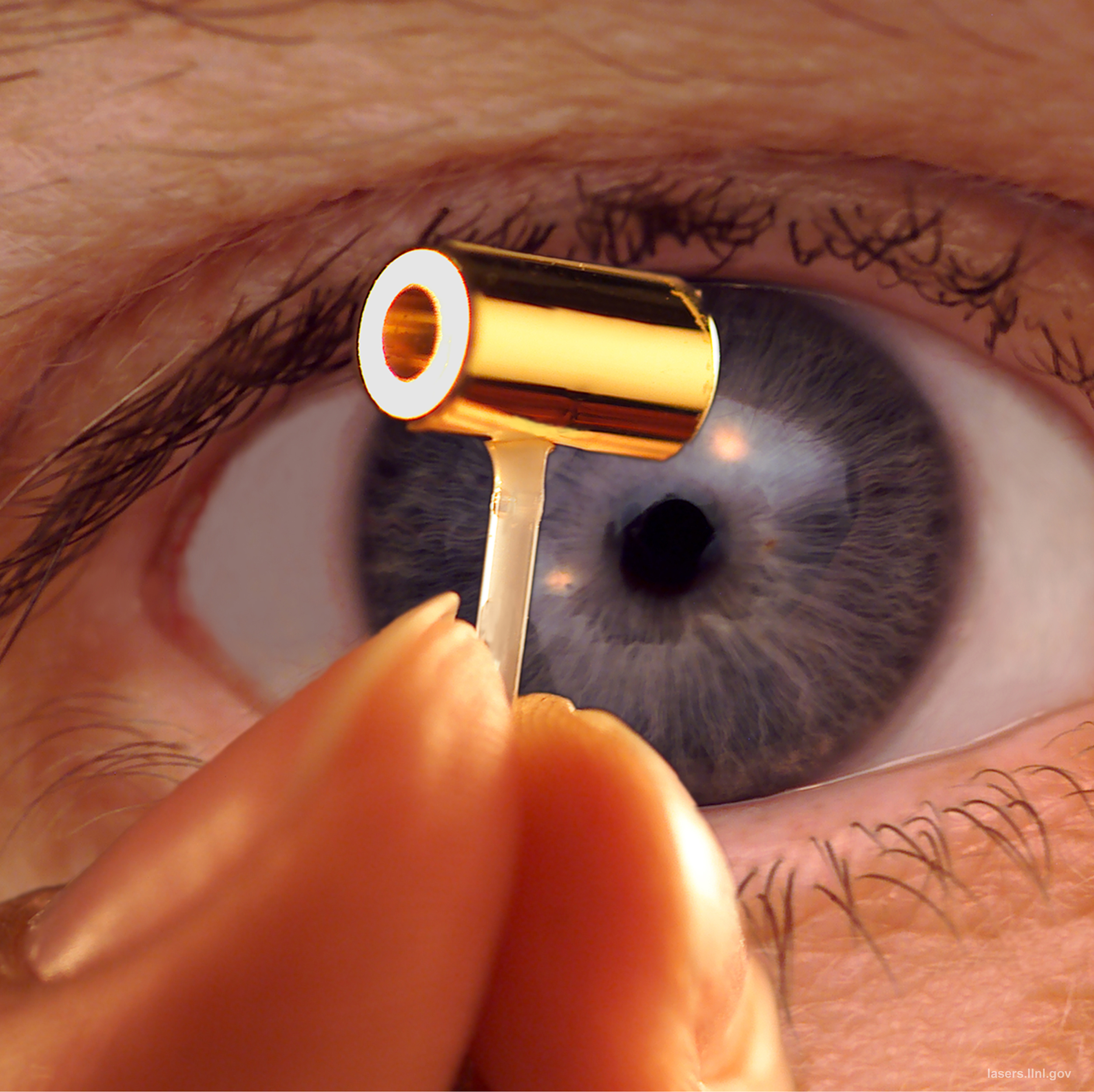
Mockup of a gold plated National Ignition Facility (NIF) hohlraum

The primary challenges with increasing ICF performance are:

- Improving the energy delivered to the target
- Controlling symmetry of the imploding fuel
- Delaying fuel heating until sufficient density is achieved
- Preventing premature mixing of hot and cool fuel by hydrodynamic instabilities
- Achieving shockwave convergence at the fuel center

In order to focus the shock wave on the center of the target, the target must be made with great precision and sphericity with tolerances of no more than a few micrometres over its (inner and outer) surface. The lasers must be precisely targeted in space and time. Beam timing is relatively simple and is solved by using delay lines in the beams' optical path to achieve picosecond accuracy. The other major issue is so-called "beam-beam" imbalance and beam anisotropy. These problems are, respectively, where the energy delivered by one beam may be higher or lower than other beams impinging and of "hot spots" within a beam diameter hitting a target which induces uneven compression on the target surface, thereby forming Rayleigh-Taylor instabilities in the fuel, prematurely mixing it and reducing heating efficacy at the instant of maximum compression. The Richtmyer-Meshkov instability is also formed during the process due to shock waves.

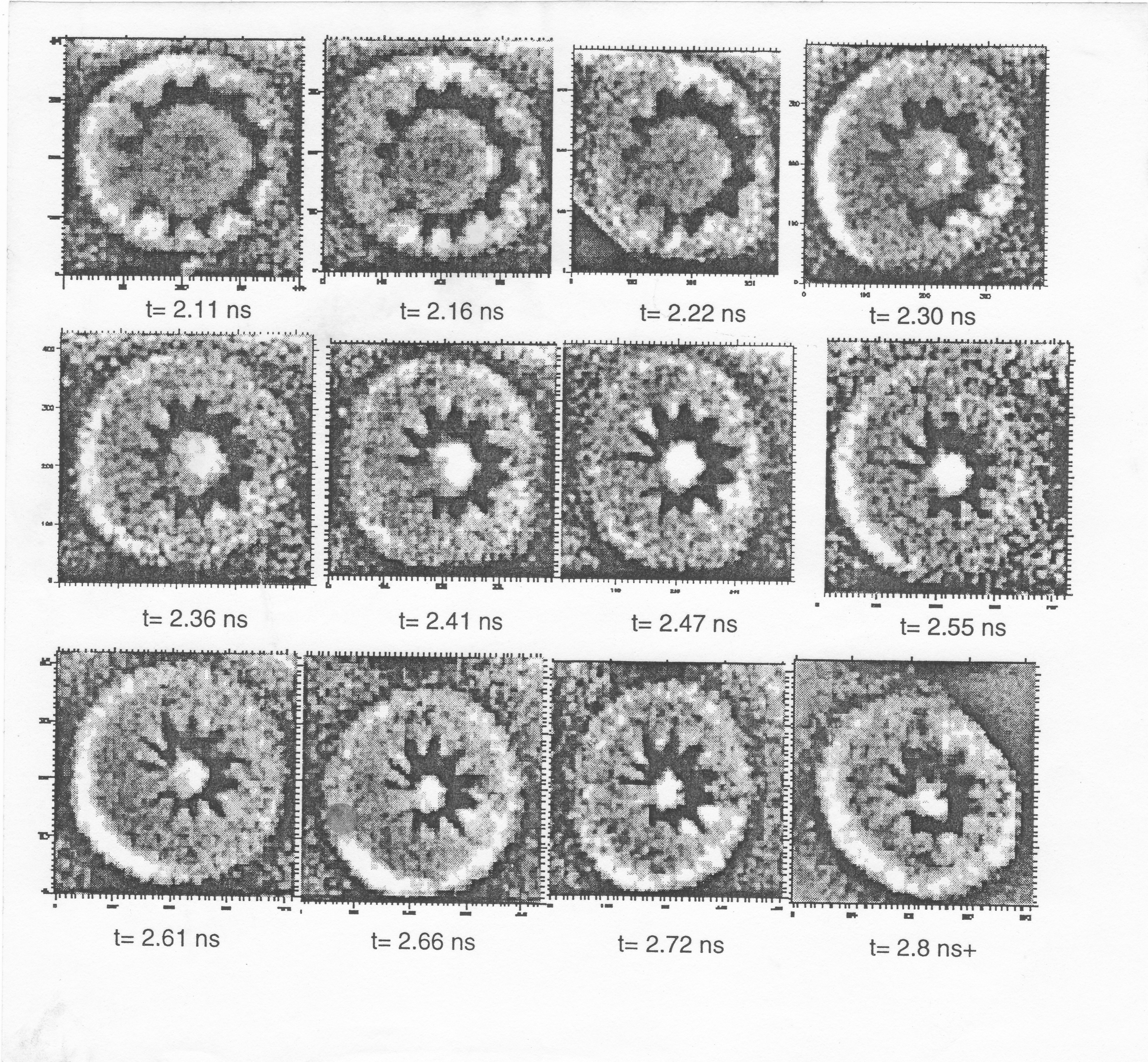
An Inertial confinement fusion target, which was a foam filled cylindrical target with machined perturbations, being compressed by the Nova Laser. This shot was done in 1995. The image shows the compression of the target, as well as the growth of the Rayleigh-Taylor instabilities.

These problems have been mitigated by beam smoothing techniques and beam energy diagnostics; however, RT instability remains a major issue. Modern cryogenic hydrogen ice targets tend to freeze a thin layer of deuterium on the inside of the shell while irradiating it with a low power infrared laser to smooth its inner surface and monitoring it with a microscope equipped camera, thereby allowing the layer to be closely monitored. Cryogenic targets filled with D-T are "self-smoothing" due to the small amount of heat created by tritium decay. This is referred to as "beta-layering".

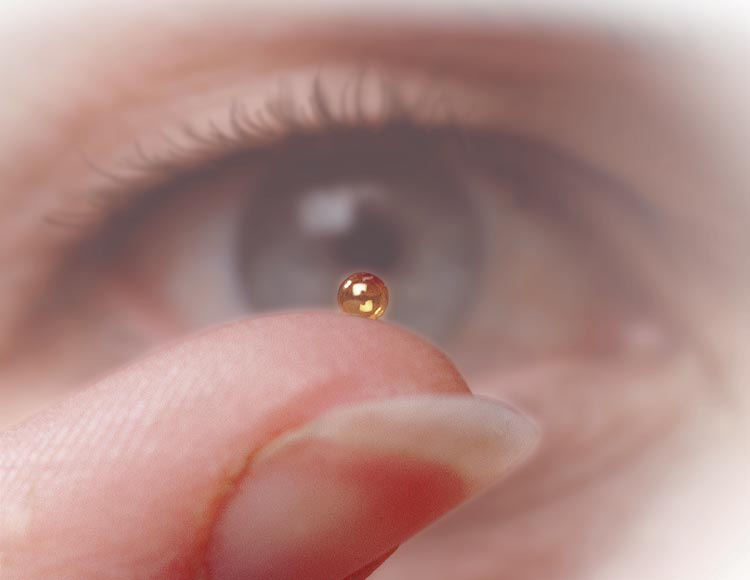
An inertial confinement fusion fuel microcapsule (sometimes called a "microballoon") of the size used on the NIF which can be filled with either deuterium and tritium gas or DT ice. The capsule can be either inserted in a hohlraum (as above) and imploded in the indirect drive mode or irradiated directly with laser energy in the direct drive configuration. Microcapsules used on previous laser systems were significantly smaller owing to the less powerful irradiation earlier lasers were capable of delivering to the target.

In the indirect drive approach, the absorption of thermal x-rays by the target is more efficient than the direct absorption of laser light. However, the hohlraums take up considerable energy to heat, significantly reducing energy transfer efficiency. Most often, indirect drive hohlraum targets are used to simulate thermonuclear weapons tests due to the fact that the fusion fuel in weapons is also imploded mainly by X-ray radiation.

ICF drivers are evolving. Lasers have scaled up from a few joules and kilowatts to megajoules and hundreds of terawatts, using mostly frequency doubled or tripled light from neodymium glass amplifiers.

Heavy ion beams are particularly interesting for commercial generation, as they are easy to create, control, and focus. However, it is difficult to achieve the energy densities required to implode a target efficiently, and most ion-beam systems require the use of a hohlraum surrounding the target to smooth out the irradiation.

== History ==
=== Conception ===
==== United States ====
ICF history began as part of the "Atoms For Peace" conference in 1957. This was an international, UN-sponsored conference between the US and the Soviet Union. Some thought was given to using a hydrogen bomb to heat a water-filled cavern. The resulting steam could then be used to power conventional generators, and thereby provide electrical power.

This meeting led to Operation Plowshare, formed in June 1957 and formally named in 1961. It included three primary concepts; energy generation under Project PACER, the use of nuclear explosions for excavation, and for fracking in the natural gas industry. PACER was directly tested in December 1961 when the 3 kt Project Gnome device was detonated in bedded salt in New Mexico. While the press looked on, radioactive steam was released from the drill shaft, at some distance from the test site. Further studies designed engineered cavities to replace natural ones, but Plowshare turned from bad to worse, especially after the failure of 1962's Sedan which produced significant fallout. PACER continued to receive funding until 1975, when a 3rd party study demonstrated that the cost of electricity from PACER would be ten times the cost of conventional nuclear plants.

Another outcome of Atoms For Peace was to prompt John Nuckolls to consider what happens on the fusion side of the bomb as fuel mass is reduced. This work suggested that at sizes on the order of milligrams, little energy would be needed to ignite the fuel, much less than a fission primary. He proposed building, in effect, tiny all-fusion explosives using a tiny drop of D-T fuel suspended in the center of a hohlraum. The shell provided the same effect as the bomb casing in an H-bomb, trapping x-rays inside to irradiate the fuel. The main difference is that the X-rays would be supplied by an external device that heated the shell from the outside until it was glowing in the x-ray region. The power would be delivered by a then-unidentified pulsed power source he referred to, using bomb terminology, as the "primary".

The main advantage to this scheme is the fusion efficiency at high densities. According to the Lawson criterion, the amount of energy needed to heat the D-T fuel to break-even conditions at ambient pressure is perhaps 100 times greater than the energy needed to compress it to a pressure that would deliver the same rate of fusion. So, in theory, the ICF approach could offer dramatically more gain. This can be understood by considering the energy losses in a conventional scenario where the fuel is slowly heated, as in the case of magnetic fusion energy; the rate of energy loss to the environment is based on the temperature difference between the fuel and its surroundings, which continues to increase as the fuel temperature increases. In the ICF case, the entire hohlraum is filled with high-temperature radiation, limiting losses.

==== Germany ====
In 1956 a meeting was organized at the Max Planck Institute in Germany by fusion pioneer Carl Friedrich von Weizsäcker. At this meeting Friedwardt Winterberg proposed the non-fission ignition of a thermonuclear micro-explosion by a convergent shock wave driven with high explosives. Further reference to Winterberg's work in Germany on nuclear micro explosions (mininukes) is contained in a declassified report of the former East German Stasi (Staatsicherheitsdienst).

In 1964 Winterberg proposed that ignition could be achieved by an intense beam of microparticles accelerated to a speed of 1000 km/s. In 1968, he proposed to use intense electron and ion beams generated by Marx generators for the same purpose. The advantage of this proposal is that charged particle beams are not only less expensive than laser beams, but can entrap the charged fusion reaction products due to the strong self-magnetic beam field, drastically reducing the compression requirements for beam ignited cylindrical targets.

==== USSR ====
In 1967, research fellow Gurgen Askaryan published an article proposing the use of focused laser beams in the fusion of lithium deuteride or deuterium.

=== Early research ===
Through the late 1950s, and collaborators at Lawrence Livermore National Laboratory (LLNL) completed computer simulations of the ICF concept. In early 1960, they performed a full simulation of the implosion of 1 mg of D-T fuel inside a dense shell. The simulation suggested that a 5 MJ power input to the hohlraum would produce 50 MJ of fusion output, a gain of 10x. This was before the laser and a variety of other possible drivers were considered, including pulsed power machines, charged particle accelerators, plasma guns, and hypervelocity pellet guns.

Two theoretical advances advanced the field. One came from new simulations that considered the timing of the energy delivered in the pulse, known as "pulse shaping", leading to better implosion. The second was to make the shell much larger and thinner, forming a thin shell as opposed to an almost solid ball. These two changes dramatically increased implosion efficiency and thereby greatly lowered the required compression energy. Using these improvements, it was calculated that a driver of about 1 MJ would be needed, a five-fold reduction. Over the next two years, other theoretical advancements were proposed, notably Ray Kidder's development of an implosion system without a hohlraum, the so-called "direct drive" approach, and Stirling Colgate and Ron Zabawski's work on systems with as little as 1 μg of D-T fuel.

The introduction of the laser in 1960 at Hughes Research Laboratories in California appeared to present a perfect driver mechanism. However, the maximum power produced by these devices appeared very limited, far below what would be needed. This was addressed with Gordon Gould's introduction of the Q-switching which was applied to lasers in 1961 at Hughes Research Laboratories. Q-switching allows a laser amplifier to be pumped to very high energies without starting stimulated emission, and then triggered to release this energy in a burst by introducing a tiny seed signal. With this technique it appeared any limits to laser power were well into the region that would be useful for ICF.

Starting in 1962, (Note: Mahlhorn says 1963.) Livermore's director John S. Foster, Jr. and Edward Teller began a small ICF laser study. Even at this early stage the suitability of ICF for weapons research was well understood and was the primary reason for its funding. Over the next decade, LLNL made small experimental devices for basic laser-plasma interaction studies.

=== Development begins ===
In 1967 Kip Siegel started KMS Industries. In the early 1970s he formed KMS Fusion to begin development of a laser-based ICF system. This development led to considerable opposition from the weapons labs, including LLNL, who put forth a variety of reasons that KMS should not be allowed to develop ICF in public. This opposition was funnelled through the Atomic Energy Commission, which controlled funding. Adding to the background noise were rumours of an aggressive Soviet ICF program, new higher-powered CO_{2} and glass lasers, the electron beam driver concept, and the energy crisis which added impetus to many energy projects.

In 1972 John Nuckolls wrote a paper introducing ICF and suggesting that testbed systems could be made to generate fusion with drivers in the kJ range, and high-gain systems with MJ drivers.

In spite of limited resources and business problems, KMS Fusion successfully demonstrated IFC fusion on 1 May 1974. This success was soon followed by Siegel's death and the end of KMS Fusion a year later. By this point several weapons labs and universities had started their own programs, notably the solid-state lasers (Nd:glass lasers) at LLNL and the University of Rochester, and krypton fluoride excimer lasers systems at Los Alamos and the Naval Research Laboratory.

=== "High-energy" ICF ===
High-energy ICF experiments (multi-hundred joules per shot) began in the early 1970s, when better lasers appeared. Funding for fusion research was stimulated by energy crises produced rapid gains in performance, and inertial designs were soon reaching the same sort of "below break-even" conditions of the best MCF systems.

LLNL was, in particular, well funded and started a laser fusion development program. Their Janus laser started operation in 1974, and validated the approach of using Nd:glass lasers for high power devices. Focusing problems were explored in the Long path and Cyclops lasers, which led to the larger Argus laser. None of these were intended to be practical devices, but they increased confidence that the approach was valid. It was then believed that a much larger device of the Cyclops type could both compress and heat targets, leading to ignition. This misconception was based on extrapolation of the fusion yields seen from experiments utilizing the so-called "exploding pusher" fuel capsule. During the late 1970s and early 1980s the estimates for laser energy on target needed to achieve ignition doubled almost yearly as plasma instabilities and laser-plasma energy coupling loss modes were increasingly understood. The realization that exploding pusher target designs and single-digit kilojoule (kJ) laser irradiation intensities would never scale to high yields led to the effort to increase laser energies to the 100 kJ level in the ultraviolet band and to the production of advanced ablator and cryogenic DT ice target designs.

=== Shiva and Nova ===
One of the earliest large scale attempts at an ICF driver design was the Shiva laser, a 20-beam neodymium doped glass laser system at LLNL that started operation in 1978. Shiva was a "proof of concept" design intended to demonstrate compression of fusion fuel capsules to many times the liquid density of hydrogen. In this, Shiva succeeded, reaching 100 times the liquid density of deuterium. However, due to the laser's coupling with hot electrons, premature heating of the dense plasma was problematic and fusion yields were low. This failure to efficiently heat the compressed plasma pointed to the use of optical frequency multipliers as a solution that would frequency triple the infrared light from the laser into the ultraviolet at 351 nm. Schemes to efficiently triple the frequency of laser light discovered at the Laboratory for Laser Energetics in 1980 was experimented with in the 24 beam OMEGA laser and the NOVETTE laser, which was followed by the Nova laser design with 10 times Shiva's energy, the first design with the specific goal of reaching ignition.

Nova also failed, this time due to severe variation in laser intensity in its beams (and differences in intensity between beams) caused by filamentation that resulted in large non-uniformity in irradiation smoothness at the target and asymmetric implosion. The techniques pioneered earlier could not address these new issues. This failure led to a much greater understanding of the process of implosion, and the way forward again seemed clear, namely to increase the uniformity of irradiation, reduce hot-spots in the laser beams through beam smoothing techniques to reduce Rayleigh–Taylor instabilities and increase laser energy on target by at least an order of magnitude. Funding was constrained in the 1980s.

=== National Ignition Facility ===
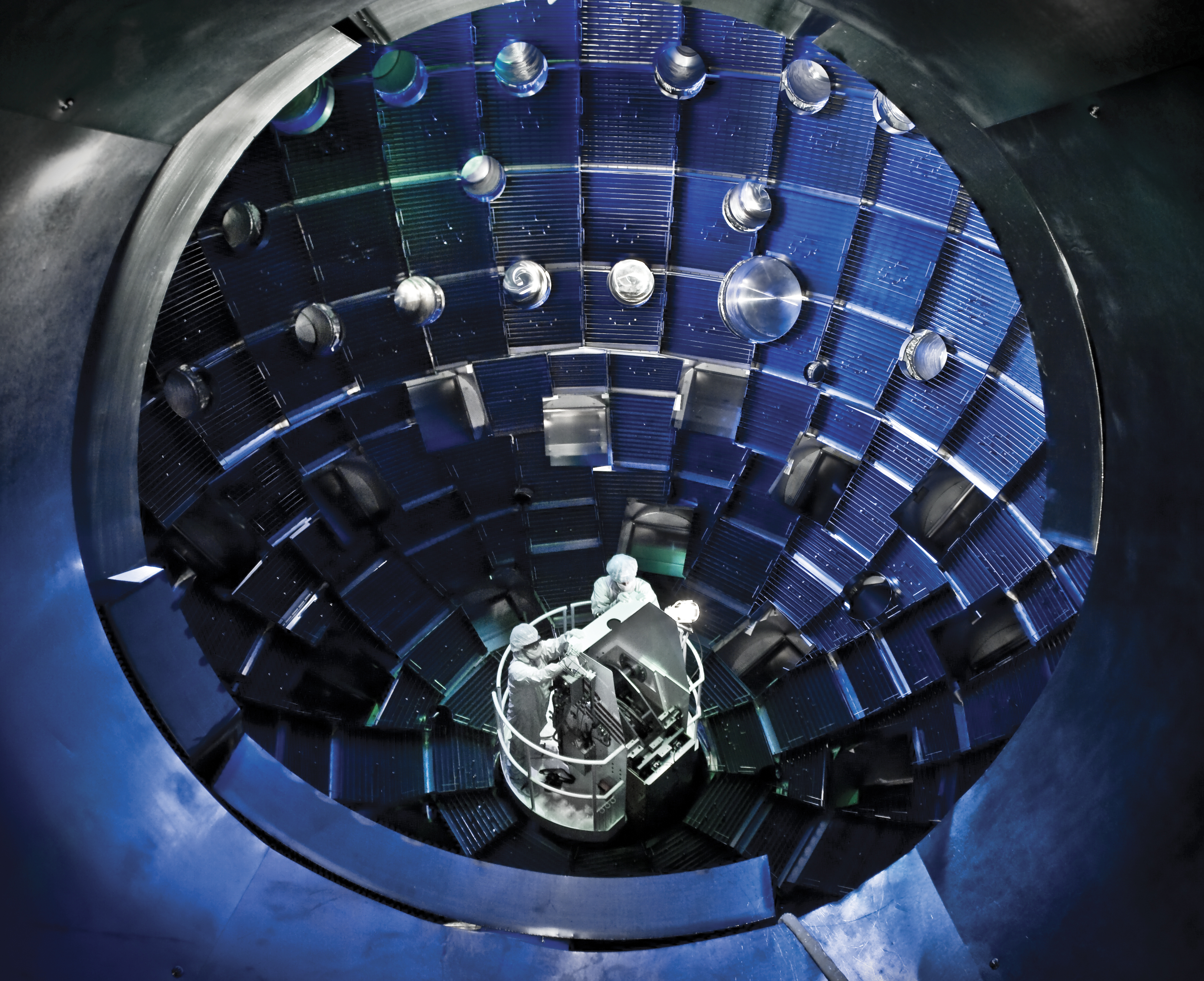
National Ignition Facility target chamber

The resulting 192-beam design, dubbed the National Ignition Facility, started construction at LLNL in 1997. NIF's main objective is to operate as the flagship experimental device of the so-called nuclear stewardship program, supporting LLNLs traditional bomb-making role. Completed in March 2009, NIF experiments set new records for power delivery by a laser. As of September 27, 2013, for the first time fusion energy generated was greater than the energy absorbed into deuterium–tritium fuel. In June, 2018 NIF announced record production of 54kJ of fusion energy output. On August 8, 2021 the NIF produced 1.3MJ of output, 25x higher than the 2018 result, generating 70% of the break-even definition of ignition – when energy out equals energy in. As of December 2022, the NIF claims to have become the first fusion experiment to achieve scientific breakeven on December 5, 2022, with an experiment producing 3.15 megajoules of energy from a 2.05 megajoule input of laser light (somewhat less than the energy needed to boil 1 kg of water) for an energy gain of about 1.5.

=== Other projects ===
The French Laser Mégajoule achieved its first experimental line in 2002, and its first target shots were conducted in 2014. The machine was roughly 75% complete as of 2016.

Using a different approach entirely is the z-pinch device. Z-pinch uses massive electric currents switched into a cylinder comprising extremely fine wires. The wires vaporize to form an electrically conductive, high current plasma. The resulting circumferential magnetic field squeezes the plasma cylinder, imploding it, generating a high-power x-ray pulse that can be used to implode a fuel capsule. Challenges to this approach include relatively low drive temperatures, resulting in slow implosion velocities and potentially large instability growth, and preheat caused by high-energy x-rays.

Shock ignition was proposed to address problems with fast ignition. Japan developed the KOYO-F design and laser inertial fusion test (LIFT) experimental reactor. In April 2017, clean energy startup Apollo Fusion began to develop a hybrid fusion-fission reactor technology.

In Germany, technology company Marvel Fusion is working on laser-initiated inertial confinement fusion. The startup adopted a short-pulsed high energy laser and the aneutronic fuel pB11. It was founded in Munich 2019. It works with Siemens Energy, TRUMPF, and Thales. The company partnered with LMU Munich in July 2022.

In March 2022, Australian company HB11 announced fusion using non-thermal laser pB11, at a higher than predicted rate of alpha particle creation. Other companies include NIF-like Longview Fusion and fast-ignition origned Focused Energy.

== Applications ==
=== Electricity generation ===
Inertial fusion energy (IFE) power plants have been studied since the late 1970s. These devices were to deliver multiple targets per second into the reaction chamber, using the resulting energy to drive a conventional steam turbine.

==== Technical challenges ====
The Electra Laser at the Naval Research Laboratory demonstrated more than 90,000 shots over 10 hours at 700 joules.

Even if the many technical challenges in reaching ignition were all to be solved, practical problems abound. Given the 1 to 1.5% efficiency of the laser amplification process and that steam-driven turbine systems are typically about 35% efficient, fusion gains would have to be on the order of 125-fold just to energetically break even.

An order of magnitude improvement in laser efficiency may be possible through the use of designs that replace flash lamps with laser diodes that are tuned to produce most of their energy in a frequency range that is strongly absorbed. Initial experimental devices offer efficiencies of about 10%, and it is suggested that 20% is possible.

NIF uses about 330 MJ to produce the driver beams, producing an expected yield of about 20 MJ, with maximum credible yield of 45 MJ.

==== Power extraction ====
ICF systems face some of the same secondary power extraction problems as MCF systems. One of the primary concerns is how to successfully remove heat from the reaction chamber without interfering with the targets and driver beams. Another concern is that the released neutrons react with the reactor structure, mechanically weakening it, and turning it intensely radioactive. Conventional metals such as steel would have a short lifetime and require frequent replacement of the core containment walls. Another concern is fusion afterdamp (debris left in the reaction chamber), which could interfere with subsequent shots, including helium ash produced by fusion, along with unburned hydrogen and other elements used in the fuel pellet. This problem is most troublesome with indirect drive systems. If the driver energy misses the fuel pellet completely and strikes the containment chamber, material could foul the interaction region, or the lenses or focusing elements.

One concept, as shown in the HYLIFE-II design, is to use a "waterfall" of FLiBe, a molten mix of fluoride salts of lithium and beryllium, which both protect the chamber from neutrons and carry away heat. The FLiBe is passed into a heat exchanger where it heats water for the turbines. The tritium produced by splitting lithium nuclei can be extracted in order to close the power plant's thermonuclear fuel cycle, a necessity for perpetual operation because tritium is rare and otherwise must be manufactured. Another concept, Sombrero, uses a reaction chamber built of carbon-fiber-reinforced polymer which has a low neutron cross section. Cooling is provided by a molten ceramic, chosen because of its ability to absorb the neutrons and its efficiency as a heat transfer agent.

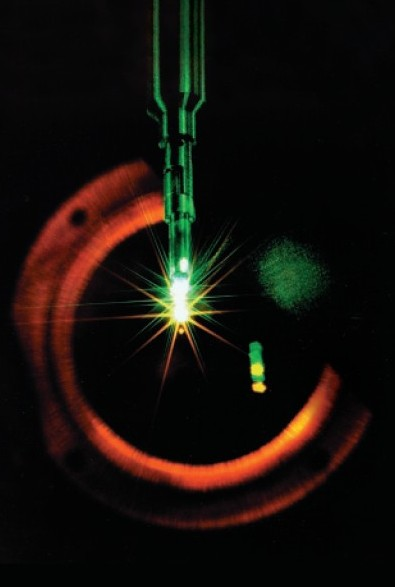
An inertial confinement fusion implosion in Nova, creating "micro sun" conditions of tremendously high density and temperature rivaling even those found at the core of the Sun.

==== Economic viability ====
Another factor working against IFE is the cost of the fuel. Even as Nuckolls was developing his earliest calculations, co-workers pointed out that if an IFE machine produces 50 MJ of fusion energy, a shot could produce perhaps 10 MJ (2.8 kWh) of energy. Wholesale rates for electrical power on the grid were about 0.3 cents/kWh at the time, which meant the monetary value of the shot was perhaps one cent. In the intervening 50 years the real price of power has remained about even, and the rate in 2012 in Ontario, Canada was about 2.8 cents/kWh. Thus, in order for an IFE plant to be economically viable, fuel shots would have to cost considerably less than ten cents in 2012 dollars.

Direct-drive systems avoid the use of a hohlraum and thereby may be less expensive in fuel terms. However, these systems still require an ablator, and the accuracy and geometrical considerations are critical. The direct-drive approach still may not be less expensive to operate.

=== Nuclear weapons ===
The hot and dense conditions encountered during an ICF experiment are similar to those in a thermonuclear weapon, and have applications to nuclear weapons programs. When energy is put into the fuel pellets, the result is shock-wave explosions. With enough shock waves, the fuel pellets combine to form helium, and a free neutron and energy is released. ICF experiments might be used, for example, to help determine how warhead performance degrades as it ages, or as part of a weapons design program. Retaining knowledge and expertise inside the nuclear weapons program is another motivation for pursuing ICF. Funding for the NIF and Z in the United States is sourced from the Nuclear Weapons Stockpile Stewardship program, whose goals are oriented accordingly. It has been argued that some aspects of ICF research violate the Comprehensive Test Ban Treaty or the Nuclear Non-Proliferation Treaty. In the long term, despite the formidable technical hurdles, ICF research could lead to the creation of a "pure fusion weapon".

=== Neutron source ===
ICF has the potential to produce orders of magnitude more neutrons than spallation. Neutrons are capable of locating hydrogen atoms in molecules, resolving atomic thermal motion and studying collective excitations of photons more effectively than X-rays. Neutron scattering studies of molecular structures could resolve problems associated with protein folding, diffusion through membranes, proton transfer mechanisms, dynamics of molecular motors, etc. by modulating thermal neutrons into beams of slow neutrons. In combination with fissile materials, neutrons produced by ICF can potentially be used in Hybrid Nuclear Fusion designs to produce electric power.

== See also ==
- Antimatter catalyzed nuclear pulse propulsion
- Bubble fusion, a phenomenon claimed – controversially – to provide an acoustic form of inertial confinement fusion.
- Dense plasma focus
- Laboratory for Laser Energetics
- Laser Mégajoule
- List of petawatt lasers
- Leonardo Mascheroni, who proposed using hydrogen fluoride lasers to achieve fusion.
- List of laser articles
- Magnetic confinement fusion
- Magnetized target fusion (MTF)
- Magneto-inertial fusion
- Proton-boron fusion
- Pulsed power

== Bibliography ==
- Nuckolls, John (1998). Early Steps Toward Inertial Fusion Energy (IFE) (PDF) (Report). Lawrence Livermore National Laboratory. doi:10.2172/658936. Archived (PDF) from the original on 2022-10-09.
- Emmett, John; Nuckolls, John; Wood, Lowell (June 1974). "Fusion Power by Laser Implosion". Scientific American. JSTOR 24950095.
- Malik, Hitendra (March 2021). Laser-Matter Interaction for Radiation and Energy. CRC Press. ISBN 978-1-315-39601-9.
- Brueckner, Keith (June 1977). "An Assessment of Laser-Driven Fusion" (PDF). International Journal of Fusion Energy. 1 (2): 25–54. Bibcode:1977IJFE....1...25. Archived (PDF) from the original on 2022-10-09.
- Pfalzner, Susanne (2006). An Introduction to Inertial Confinement Fusion. CRC Press. ISBN 978-1-4200-1184-5.
- Keefe, Denis (March 1982). Inertial Confinement Fusion (PDF) (Technical report). Lawrence Berkeley National Laboratory. Archived (PDF) from the original on 2022-10-09.
