= Janus laser =

Laser in California, US

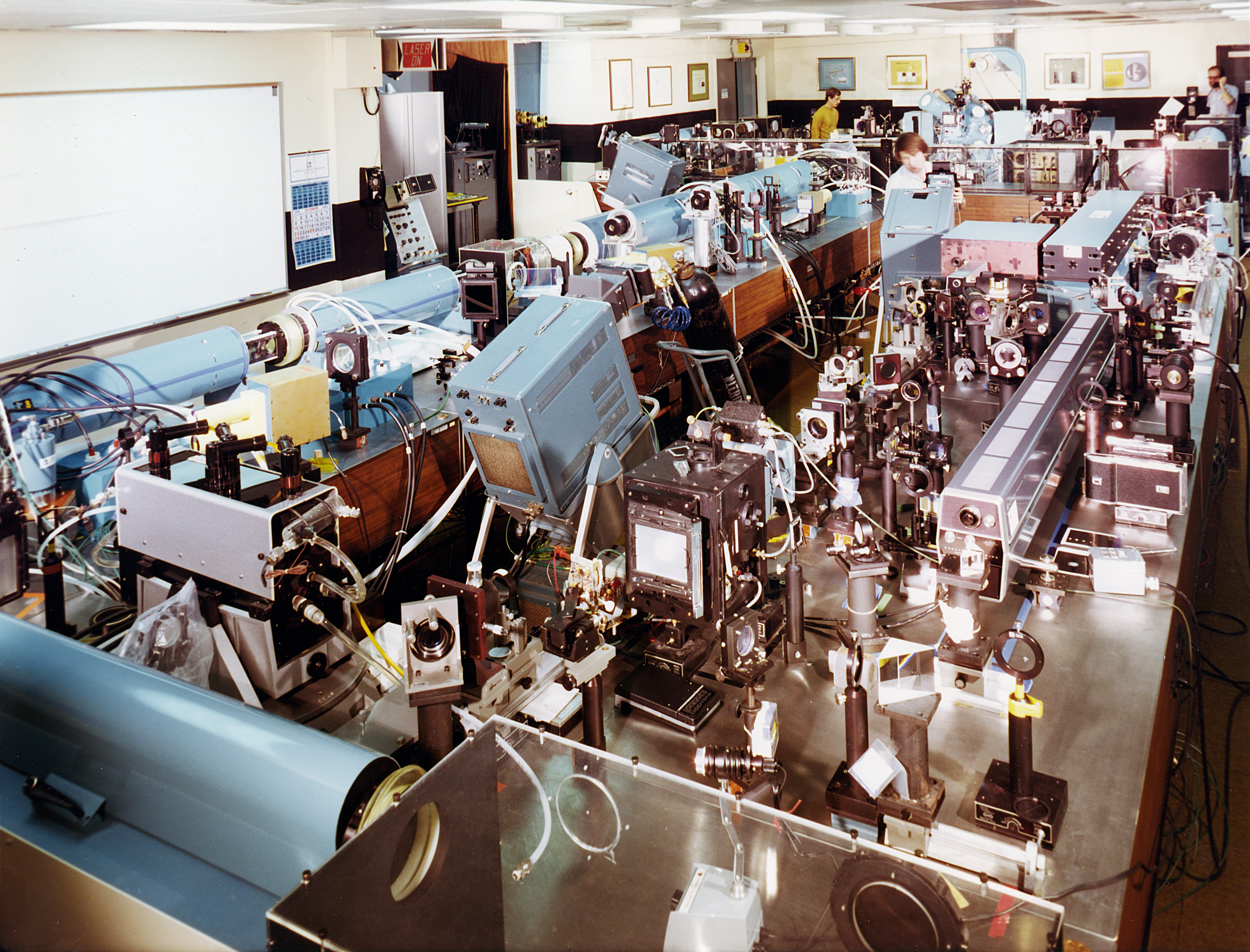
The Janus laser as it appeared in 1975.

The Janus laser was a (then considered high power) two beam infrared neodymium doped silica glass laser built at Lawrence Livermore National Laboratory in 1974 for the study of inertial confinement fusion. Janus was built using about 100 pounds of Nd:glass laser material. Initially, Janus was only capable of producing laser pulses of about 10 joules of energy at a power of 0.5TW. It was the first laser at Livermore to generate thermonuclear fusion via the irradiation of DT gas filled glass ("exploding pusher") targets.

== See also ==
- List of laser articles
- List of laser types
