= GEKKO XII =

High-power laser

The Gekko XII Laser (激光XII号レーザー) is a high-power, 12-beam, neodymium-doped glass laser at the Osaka University's Institute for Laser Engineering (大阪大学レーザーエネルギー学研究センター) completed in 1983, which is used for high energy density physics and inertial confinement fusion research. The name refers to the twelve individual beamlines used to amplify the laser energy.

Unlike most other modern ICF lasers, which are frequency tripled to the third harmonic, the GEKKO XII is only frequency doubled to 532 nm (green light). Compared to most Nd:glass laser ICF experiments, GEKKO is also quite small, with beamlines about 10 m long. The 12 beams of the GEKKO laser are capable of delivering about 10 kilojoules per 1–2 ns pulse (10–20 terawatts).

From 1996 to 1997 the GEKKO system was upgraded with a ~0.4 kJ, 0.5 PW ultra-short pulse beam which was used to investigate a promising new technique of ICF known as "fast ignition", where the compression phase of target implosion is decoupled from the heating phase. GEKKO, using the petawatt beam for heating, along with the original beams for compression, demonstrated a fusion yield enhancement of 3 orders of magnitude when the petawatt beam was used.

GEKKO is currently being upgraded with the addition of a second "side-by-side" laser, the LFEX (Laser for Fast Ignition Experiment), part of the FIREX-1 program, in order to deliver a 10 kJ pulse of energy to a target in 10 picoseconds, further exploring the fast ignition regime.

== See also ==
- List of laser types
