= Laboratory for Laser Energetics =

University of Rochester research center in Brighton, New York

- Motto: "A unique national resource"
- Established: 1970
- Research type: Unclassified
- Field of research: The investigation of the interaction of intense radiation with matter
- Director: Christopher Deeney
- Staff: 400 - 500 people
- Location: 250 East River Rd; Rochester, NY 14623-1212, Brighton, New York, 14623, US; 43.113108°N 77.632012°W
- Affiliations: United States Department of Energy; MIT Plasma Science and Fusion Center; State University of New York at Geneseo; University of Nevada, Reno; University of Wisconsin–Madison
- Operating agency: University of Rochester
- Website: lle.rochester.edu

The Laboratory for Laser Energetics (LLE) is a scientific research facility on the University of Rochester's south campus, located in Brighton, New York. The lab was established in 1970 with operations jointly funded by the United States Department of Energy, the University of Rochester, and the New York State government.

The Laser Lab was commissioned to investigate high-energy physics involving the interaction of extremely intense laser radiation with matter. Scientific experiments at the facility emphasize inertial-confinement, direct-drive, laser-induced fusion, fundamental plasma physics, and astrophysics using the OMEGA Laser Facility. In June 1995, OMEGA became the world's highest-energy ultraviolet laser. The LLE's OMEGA and OMEGA EP lasers are the largest and most powerful laser systems found at any academic institution in the world, and the Omega Laser Facility is the largest university-based Department of Energy laser facility in the United States. The lab shares its building with the Center for Optoelectronics and Imaging and the Center for Optics Manufacturing. The Robert L. Sproull Center for Ultra High Intensity Laser Research was opened in 2005 and houses the OMEGA EP laser, which was completed in May 2008.

More than 270 Ph.D.s have been awarded as of 2022 for research conducted at the LLE. During summer months, the lab sponsors local-area high-school juniors in research at the laboratory, with most of their projects led by senior scientists at the lab.

== History ==
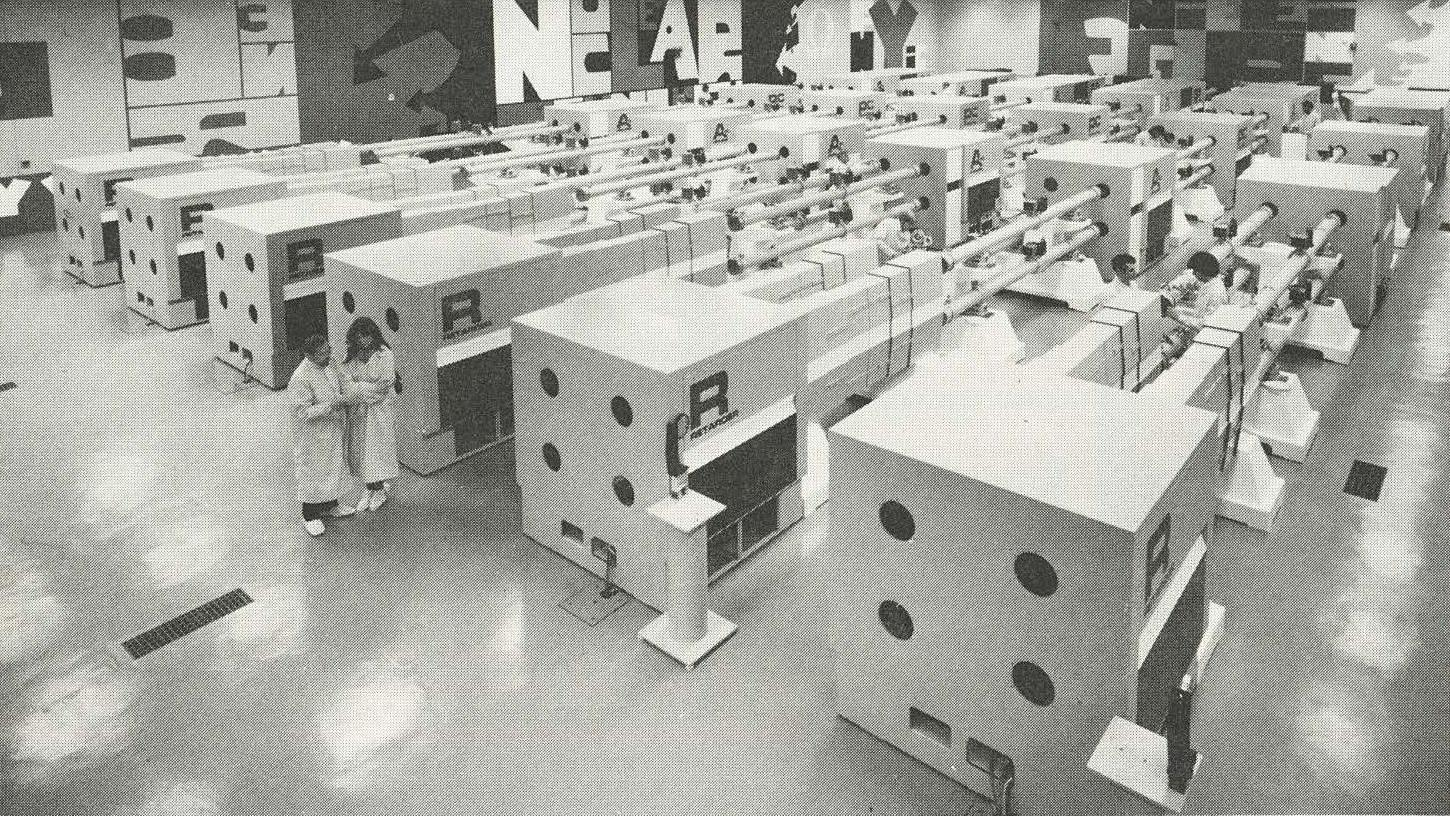
The OMEGA laser system in 1986

The LLE was founded on the University of Rochester's campus in 1970, by Dr. Moshe Lubin. Working with outside companies such as Kodak, the team built Delta, a four-beam laser system, in 1972. Construction started on the current LLE site in 1976. The facility opened a six-beam laser system in 1978 and followed with a 24-beam system two years later. In 2018, Donna Strickland and Gérard Mourou shared a Nobel prize for work they had undertaken in 1985 while at LLE. They invented a method to amplify laser pulses by "chirping", for which they shared the 2018 Nobel Prize in Physics. This method disperses a short, broadband pulse of laser light into a temporally longer spectrum of wavelengths. The system amplifies the laser at each wavelength and then reconstitutes the beam into one color. Chirp-pulsed amplification became instrumental in building the National Ignition Facility and the OMEGA EP system. In 1995, the OMEGA Laser system was increased to 60 beams, and in 2008 the OMEGA Extended Performance (OMEGA EP) system was opened.

The Guardian and Scientific American provided simplified summaries of the work of Strickland and Mourou: it "paved the way for the shortest, most intense laser beams ever created". "The ultrabrief, ultrasharp beams can be used to make extremely precise cuts so their technique is now used in laser machining and enables doctors to perform millions of corrective" laser eye surgeries.

== OMEGA laser ==
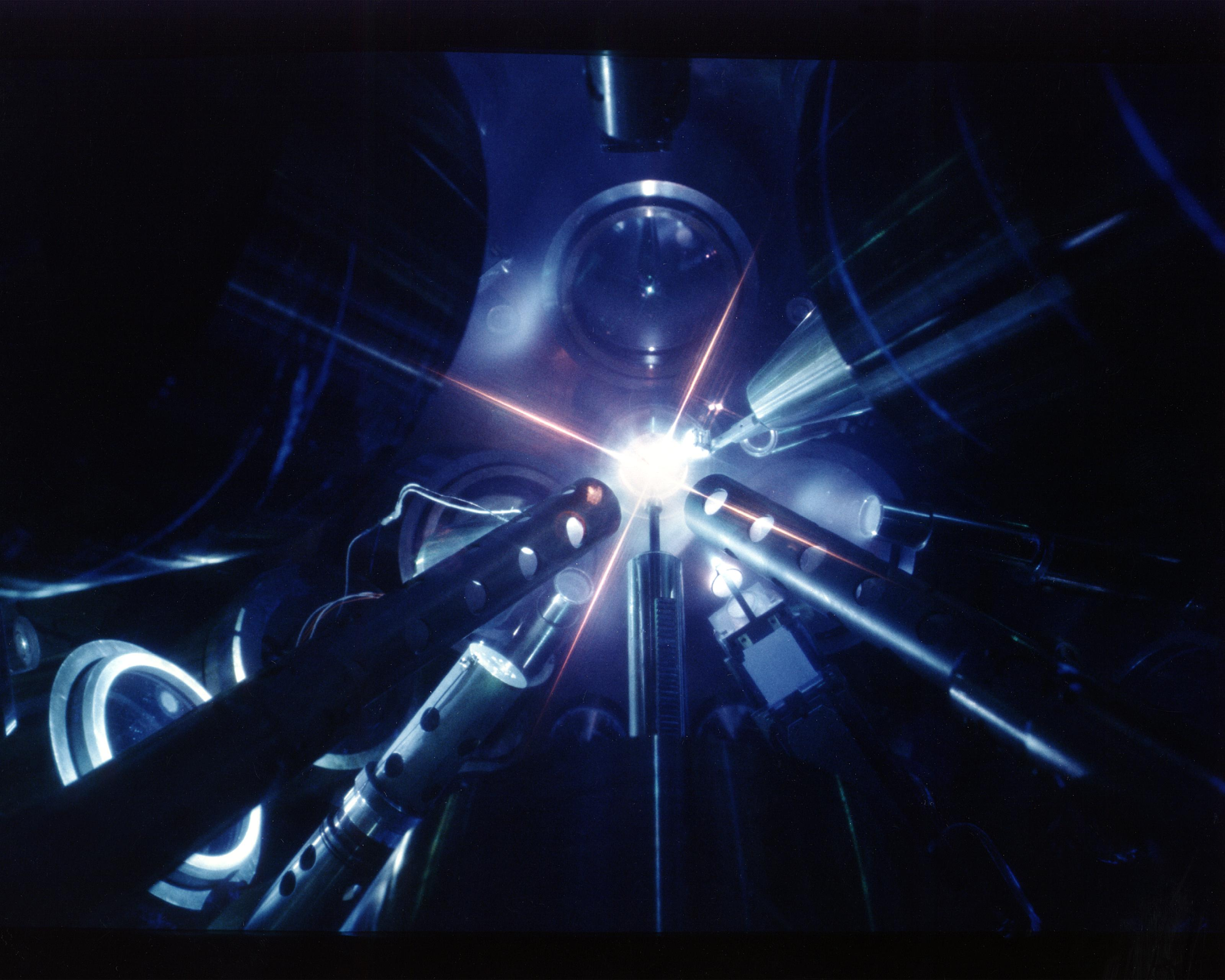
View inside the Omega target chamber at the moment of system operation.

The OMEGA laser is a laser device at the LLE built to perform direct-drive inertial-confinement fusion experiments. It is a 60-beam ultraviolet frequency-tripled neodymium glass laser, which is designed to deliver up to 30 kilojoules of 351-nm ultraviolet energy on target at peak powers of up to 30 terawatts, making it one of the most powerful and highest-energy lasers in the world. During acceptance tests following the completion of the 60-beam upgrade in 1995, the system demonstrated stable on-target irradiation of up to 37 kilojoules of ultraviolet energy. Together with OMEGA EP, it is one of the two most powerful lasers located at any academic institution. The laser light can be focused onto a spherical target less than 1 millimeter in diameter, suspended in a spherical vacuum chamber 3.3 meters in diameter.

Initial construction and commissioning of the laser were completed in 1980 under a $21 million contract between the University of Rochester and the US Department of Energy. At the time, it was a 24-beam, 15-terawatt system. It was upgraded between 1990 and 1995 for $61 million into the 60-beam system that exists today. OMEGA held the record for highest-energy laser (per pulse) from 1999 (after the Nova laser's dismantling) to 2005, when the first 8 beams of the National Ignition Facility exceeded OMEGA's output by about 30 kJ in the ultraviolet.

OMEGA is used for direct-drive inertial-confinement fusion experiments, in which the lasers compress a target filled with fusion fuel, forming a hot, dense region at the center in which nuclear fusion reactions occur. OMEGA once held the record for highest neutron yield of any inertial-confinement fusion device, with deuterium-tritium target implosions in the 1990s producing 1.4×10^{14} neutrons, the highest yield recorded from any laser system at that time. It has demonstrated yields of over 5×10^{13} reactions per implosion, with internal pressures of over 50 gigabar.

== OMEGA EP laser ==
The OMEGA EP (extended performance) laser system is an independently operable laser device and extension to OMEGA dedicated on May 16, 2008, with the purpose of studying advanced ignition techniques. It hosts four NIF-like laser beams, each capable of delivering up to 1.6 kilojoules of energy, as well as a new target chamber. Two of the beams possess pulse-compression gratings, allowing for pulses as short as 1 picosecond. The laser is housed inside a 2005 building addition.

While OMEGA EP normally operates separately from OMEGA, its two short-pulse beams can also be combined and directed into the OMEGA target chamber, in addition to OMEGA's 60 existing beams. The high powers of these beams combined with their ability to be independently timed enables integrated fast-ignition experiments, in which the OMEGA laser compresses a spherical target full of fusion fuel and then OMEGA EP drives a beam of electrons into its center, kick-starting thermonuclear burn. The combination of the OMEGA and the OMEGA EP laser systems makes LLE the world's only fully integrated cryogenic fast-ignition experimental facility.

== Organization ==
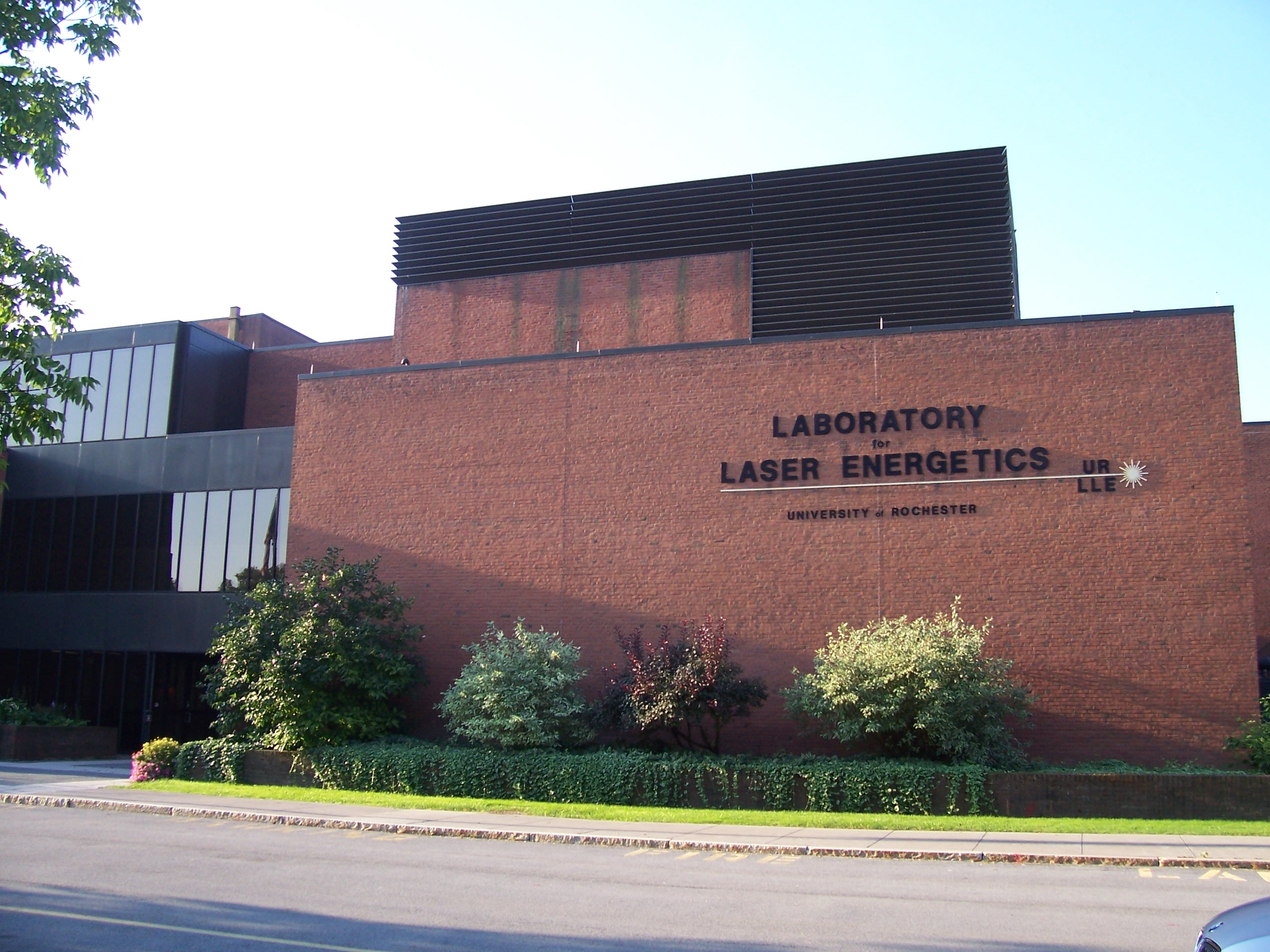
West entrance of the Laboratory for Laser Energetics

LLE is located at and operated by the University of Rochester. OMEGA and OMEGA EP are user facilities, open for use by the entire scientific community, and together constitute the largest university-based national laser users' facility in the world, serving more than 800 researchers from over 70 institutions each year.

LLE's principal sponsor is the Department of Energy/National Nuclear Security Administration (DOE/NNSA) Office of Defense Programs, which supports its stockpile stewardship and advanced scientific-computing programs. In fiscal year 2026, LLE received $111 million in federal funding from the DOE/NNSA, the largest annual funding level in its history.

The Laboratory has a five-fold mission:

- To conduct implosion experiments and basic physics experiments in support of the National Inertial Confinement Fusion (ICF) program,
- To develop new laser and materials technologies,
- To provide graduate and undergraduate education in electro-optics, high-power lasers, high-energy-density physics, plasma physics, and nuclear-fusion technology,
- To operate the National Laser Users' Facility, and
- To conduct research and development in advanced technology related to high-energy-density phenomena.

== See also ==
- HiPER
- Riccardo Betti
- Gérard Mourou
- Big Science
- List of plasma physics software
