= Ion laser =

Type of gas laser

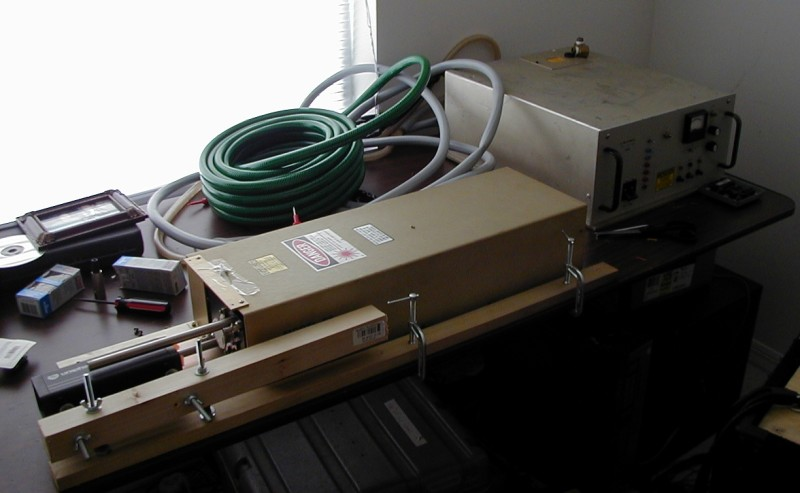
1 mW Uniphase HeNe on alignment rig (left) and 2 W Lexel 88 argon-ion laser (center) with power-supply (right). To the rear are hoses for water cooling.

An ion laser is a gas laser that uses an ionized gas as its lasing medium. Like other gas lasers, ion lasers feature a sealed cavity containing the laser medium and mirrors forming a Fabry–Pérot resonator. Unlike helium–neon lasers, the energy level transitions that contribute to laser action come from ions. Because of the large amount of energy required to excite the ionic transitions used in ion lasers, the required current is much greater, and as a result almost all except for the smallest ion lasers are water-cooled. A small air-cooled ion laser might produce, for example, 130 milliwatts of output light with a tube current of about 10 amperes and a voltage of 105 volts. Since one ampere times one volt is one watt, this is an electrical power input of about one kilowatt. Subtracting the (desirable) light output of 130 mW from power input, this leaves the large amount of waste heat of nearly one kW. This has to be dissipated by the cooling system. In other words, the power efficiency is very low.

== Types ==
=== Krypton laser ===
A krypton laser is an ion laser using ions of the noble gas krypton as its gain medium. The laser pumping is done by an electrical discharge. Krypton lasers are widely used in scientific research, and in commercial uses, when the krypton is mixed with argon, it creates a "white-light" lasers, useful for laser light shows. Krypton lasers are also used in medicine (e.g. for coagulation of retina), for the manufacture of security holograms, and numerous other purposes.

Krypton lasers can emit visible light close to several different wavelengths, commonly 406.7 nm, 413.1 nm, 415.4 nm, 468.0 nm, 476.2 nm, 482.5 nm, 520.8 nm, 530.9 nm, 568.2 nm, 647.1 nm, and 676.4 nm.

=== Argon laser ===
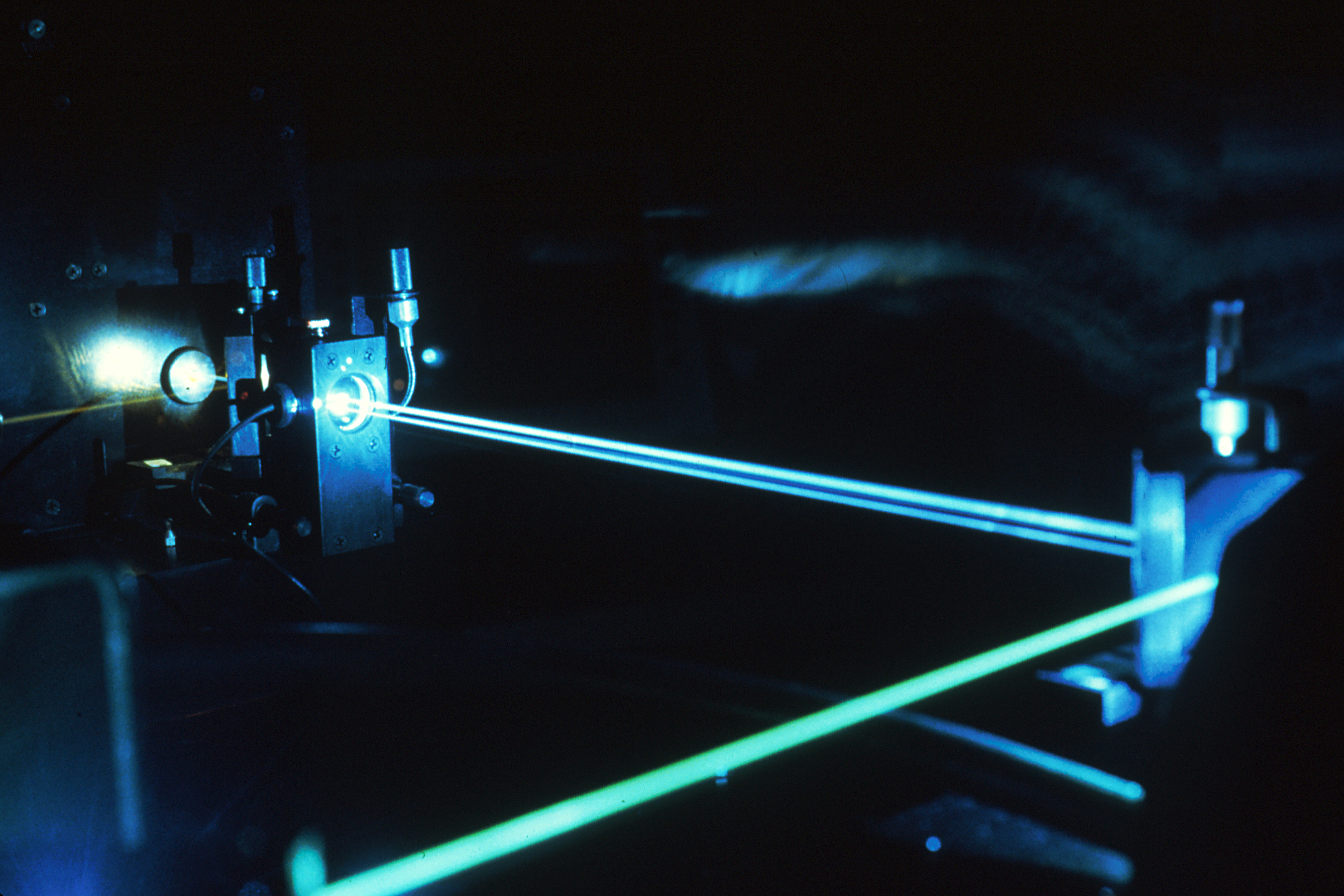
This argon-ion laser emits blue–green light at 488 and 514 nm

The argon-ion laser was invented in 1964 by William Bridges at the Hughes Aircraft Company and it is one of the family of ion lasers that use a noble gas as the active medium.

Argon-ion lasers are used for retinal phototherapy (for the treatment of diabetes), lithography, and the pumping of other lasers. Argon-ion lasers emit at 13 wavelengths through the visible and ultraviolet spectra, including: 351.1 nm, 363.8 nm, 454.6 nm, 457.9 nm, 465.8 nm, 476.5 nm, 488.0 nm, 496.5 nm, 501.7 nm, 514.5 nm, 528.7 nm, and 1092.3 nm. However, the most commonly used wavelengths are in the blue–green region of the visible spectrum. These wavelengths have the potential for use in underwater communications because seawater is quite transparent in this range of wavelengths.

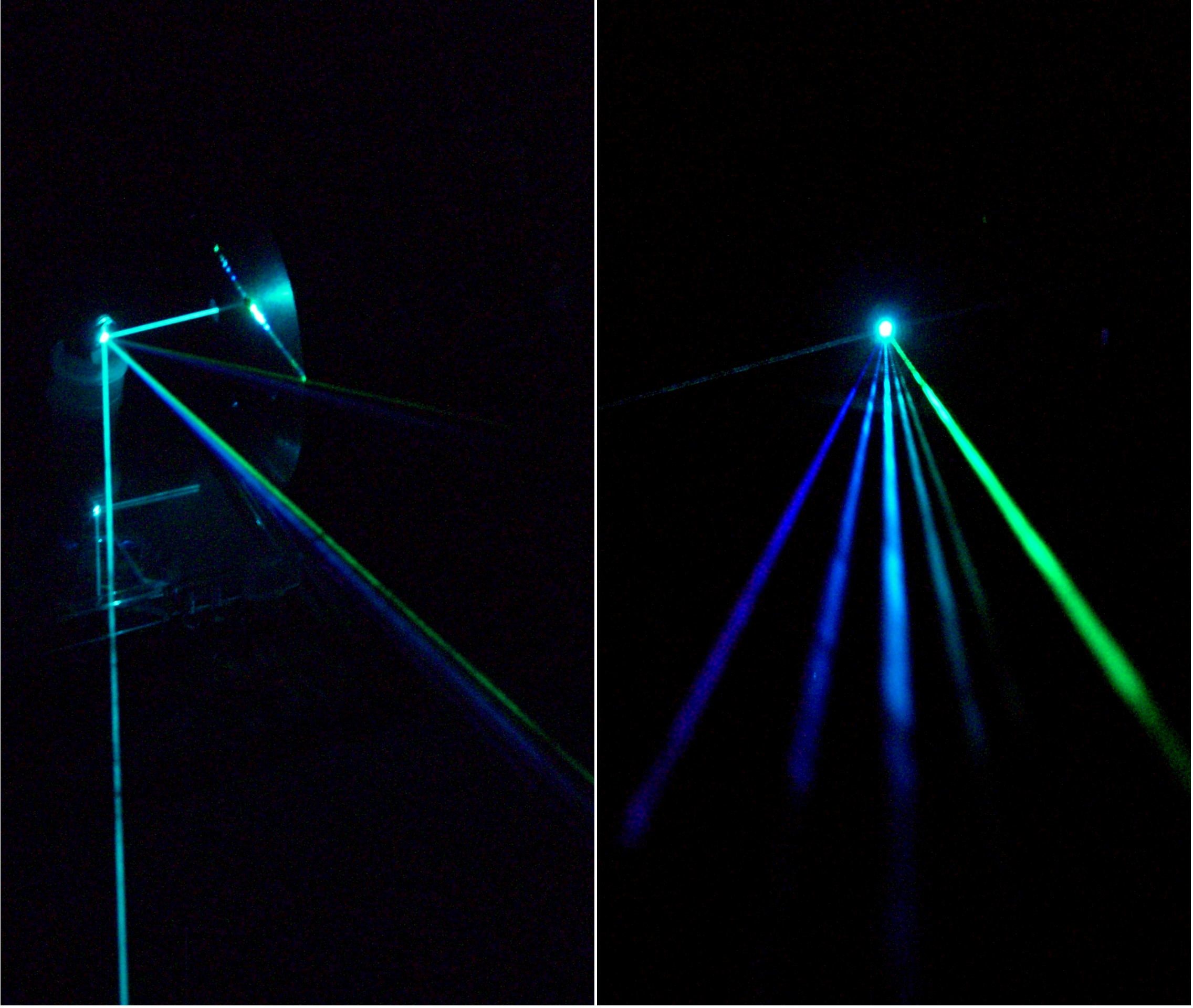
An argon-laser beam consisting of multiple colors (wavelengths) strikes a silicon diffraction mirror grating and is separated into several beams, one for each wavelength (left to right): 458 nm, 476 nm, 488 nm, 497 nm, 502 nm, and 515 nm

Common argon and krypton lasers are capable of emitting continuous-wave (CW) output of several milliwatts to tens of watts. Their tubes are usually made from nickel end bells, kovar metal-to-ceramic seals, beryllium oxide ceramics, or tungsten disks mounted on a copper heat spreader in a ceramic liner. The earliest tubes were simple quartz, then followed by quartz with graphite disks. In comparison with the helium–neon lasers, which require just a few milliamperes of input current, the current used for pumping the argon laser is several amperes, since the gas has to be ionized. The ion laser tube produces much waste heat, and such lasers require active cooling.

The typical noble-gas ion-laser plasma consists of a high-current-density glow discharge in a noble gas in the presence of a magnetic field. Typical continuous-wave plasma conditions are current densities of 100 to 2000 A/cm^{2}, tube diameters of 1.0 to 10 mm, filling pressures of 0.1 to 1.0 Torr (0.0019 to 0.019 psi), and an axial magnetic field of the order of 1000 gauss.

William R. Bennett, a co-inventor of the first gas laser (the helium–neon laser), was the first to observe spectral hole burning effects in gas lasers, and he created the theory of "hole burning" effects in laser oscillation. He was co-discoverer of lasers using electron-impact excitation in each of the noble gases, dissociative excitation transfer in the neon–oxygen laser (the first chemical laser), and collision excitation in several metal-vapor lasers.

=== Other commercially available types ===
- Ar/Kr: A mix of argon and krypton can result in a laser with output wavelengths that appear as white light.
- Helium–cadmium: blue laser emission at 442 nm and ultraviolet at 325 nm.
- Copper vapor: yellow and green emission at 578 nm and 510 nm.

=== Experimental ===
- Xenon
- Iodine
- Oxygen

== Applications ==
- Confocal laser scanning microscopy
- Surgical
- Laser medicine
- High-speed typesetters
- Laser-light shows
- DNA sequencers
- Spectroscopy experiments
- Pumping dye lasers
- Semiconductor wafer inspection
- Direct write high density PCB lithography
- Fiber Bragg Grating production
- Long coherence length models can be used for holography.

== See also ==
- Laser
- List of laser types
