= Leonardo Mascheroni =

Physicist born 1935

Pedro Leonardo Mascheroni (born 1935) is a physicist who, according to the United States government, attempted to sell nuclear secrets to a Federal Bureau of Investigation (FBI) agent posing as a Venezuelan spy. "U.S. authorities stressed that the Venezuelan government had no role in the affair."

== Background ==
Mascheroni, originally from Argentina, went to the US in 1963 to study at the University of California, Berkeley, where he gained a doctorate. He became a US citizen in 1972.

He worked at Los Alamos National Laboratory from 1979 to 1987. In the 1980s he was suspected by some of his superiors of being a spy for Argentina, and whilst never charged (and no evidence being found by the FBI), was stripped of his security clearance and fired from Los Alamos in 1987.

He left Los Alamos after a controversy surrounding his idea of using hydrogen fluoride lasers to generate nuclear fusion. Since then, he has been critical of Los Alamos and has attempted to lobby the United States Congress to fund his idea. According to the Miami Herald, he has been described as both a "nut" and a "prophet". He is married to Marjorie Roxby Mascheroni, herself a former technical writer for Los Alamos.

== 2009 Investigation ==
In 2009, the FBI raided Mascheroni's home on suspicion of his being a spy, an allegation he denied in an interview with the Albuquerque Journal: "I would have left this country already if I were a spy...Spies do not take their case in front of Congress, and they don't leave all their files and computers and everything here for the FBI to just come and take." Some fellow scientists defended Mascheroni at the time, saying he was not a spy.

== 2010 Indictment ==
In 2010, Mascheroni was indicted on suspicion of selling classified information. According to the United States, Mascheroni allegedly told a man whom he believed to be from the Venezuelan embassy that he could help Venezuela develop a nuclear bomb within ten years using a secret underground nuclear reactor. The man turned out to be an undercover FBI agent, and Mascheroni was subsequently arrested. Mascheroni allegedly charged the phony Venezuelan agent $793,000 for the 132-page document, which he titled A Deterrence Program for Venezuela. Mascheroni was also reportedly interested in obtaining Venezuelan citizenship. He denied the accusations, claiming that he was merely "driven by science". Venezuelan leader Hugo Chávez, who has denied being interested in developing nuclear weapons, has been critical of the United States' conduct in the Mascheroni case, "suggesting the FBI deliberately created a disinformation campaign."

If convicted, Mascheroni and his wife faced potential life sentences.

== 2013 Conviction ==
On June 21, 2013, Mascheroni and his wife pleaded guilty in Federal court. Mascheroni faced a prison sentence of 24 to 66 months. His wife faced a prison sentence of 12 to 24 months.

According to the Federal Bureau of Prisons website, he was released in March 2018.

== See also ==
- Atomic spies
- Wen Ho Lee
