= Optical frequency multiplier =

Nonlinear optical device

An optical frequency multiplier is a nonlinear optical device in which photons interacting with a nonlinear material are effectively "combined" to form new photons with greater energy, and thus higher frequency (and shorter wavelength). Two types of devices are currently common: frequency doublers, often based on lithium niobate (LN), lithium tantalate (LT), potassium titanyl phosphate (KTP) or lithium triborate (LBO), and frequency triplers typically made of potassium dihydrogen phosphate (KDP). Both are widely used in optical experiments that use lasers as a light source.

== Harmonic generation ==
There are two processes that are commonly used to achieve the conversion: second-harmonic generation (SHG, also called frequency doubling), or sum-frequency generation which sums two non-similar frequencies. Direct third-harmonic generation (THG, also called frequency tripling) also exists and can be used to detect an interface between materials of different excitability. For example, it has been used to extract the outline of cells in embryos, where the cells are separated by water.

== Lasers ==
Optical frequency multipliers are common in high-power lasers, notably those used for inertial confinement fusion (ICF) experiments. ICF attempts to use a laser to heat and compress a target containing fusion fuel, and it was found in experiments with the Shiva laser that the infrared frequencies generated by the laser lost most of its energy in the hot electrons being generated early in the heating process. In order to avoid this problem much shorter wavelengths needed to be used, and experiments on the OMEGA laser and Novette laser validated the use of frequency tripling KDP crystals to convert the laser light into the ultraviolet, a process that has been used on almost every laser-driven ICF experiment since then, including the National Ignition Facility.
