= List of laser types =

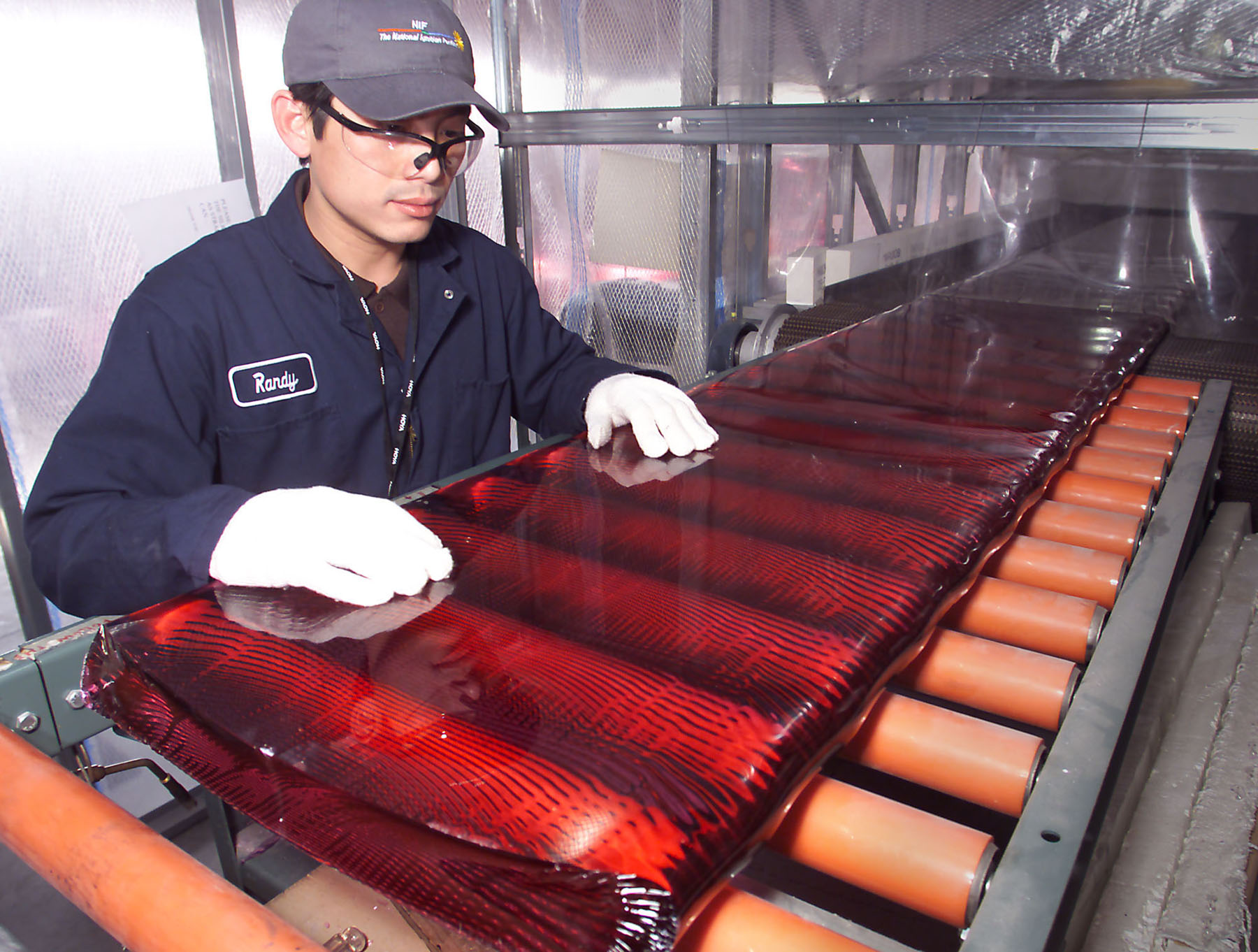
An immense slab of "continuous melt" processed neodymium-doped laser glass for use on the National Ignition Facility.

This is a list of laser types, their operational wavelengths, and their applications. Thousands of kinds of laser are known, but most of them are used only for specialized research.

== Overview ==
Wavelengths of commercially available lasers. Laser types with distinct laser lines are shown above the wavelength bar, while below are shown lasers that can emit in a wavelength range. The height of the lines and bars gives an indication of the maximal power/pulse energy commercially available, while the color codifies the type of laser material (see the figure description for details). Most of the data comes from Weber's book Handbook of laser wavelengths, with newer data in particular for the semiconductor lasers.

== Gas lasers ==
| Laser gain medium and type | Operation wavelength(s) | Pump source | Applications and notes |
|---|---|---|---|
| Helium–neon laser | 632.8 nm (543.5 nm, 593.9 nm, 611.8 nm, 1.1523 μm, 1.52 μm, 3.3913 μm) | Electrical discharge | Interferometry, holography, spectroscopy, barcode scanning, alignment, optical demonstrations. |
| Argon laser | 454.6 nm, 488.0 nm, 514.5 nm (351 nm, 363.8, 457.9 nm, 465.8 nm, 476.5 nm, 472.7 nm, 528.7 nm, also frequency doubled to provide 244 nm, 227 nm) | Electrical discharge | Retinal phototherapy (for diabetes), lithography, confocal microscopy, spectroscopy pumping other lasers. |
| Krypton laser | 416 nm, 530.9 nm, 568.2 nm, 647.1 nm, 676.4 nm, 752.5 nm, 799.3 nm | Electrical discharge | Scientific research, mixed with argon to create "white-light" lasers, light shows. |
| Xenon ion laser | Many lines throughout visible spectrum extending into the UV and IR | Electrical discharge | Scientific research. |
| Nitrogen laser | 337.1 nm | Electrical discharge | Pumping of dye lasers, measuring air pollution, scientific research. Nitrogen lasers can operate superradiantly (without a resonator cavity). Amateur laser construction. See TEA laser. |
| Carbon dioxide laser | 10.6 μm, (9.4 μm) | Transverse (high-power) or longitudinal (low-power) electrical discharge | Material processing (laser cutting, laser beam welding, etc.), surgery, dental laser, military lasers. |
| Carbon monoxide laser | 2.6 to 4 μm, 4.8 to 8.3 μm | Electrical discharge | Material processing (engraving, welding, etc.), photoacoustic spectroscopy. |
| Excimer laser | 157 nm (F_{2}), 193.3 nm (ArF), 248 nm (KrF), 308 nm (XeCl), 351 nm (XeF) | Excimer recombination via electrical discharge | Ultraviolet lithography for semiconductor manufacturing, laser surgery, LASIK, scientific research. |

== Chemical lasers ==
Used as directed-energy weapons.

| Laser gain medium and type | Operation wavelength(s) | Pump source | Applications and notes |
|---|---|---|---|
| Hydrogen fluoride laser | 2.7 to 2.9 μm for hydrogen fluoride (<80% atmospheric transmittance) | Chemical reaction in a burning jet of ethylene and nitrogen trifluoride (NF_{3}) | Used in research for laser weaponry, operated in continuous-wave mode, can have power in the megawatt range. |
| Deuterium fluoride laser | ~3800 nm (3.6 to 4.2 μm) (~90% atm. transmittance) | chemical reaction | US military laser prototypes. |
| COIL (chemical oxygen–iodine laser) | 1.315 μm (<70% atmospheric transmittance) | Chemical reaction in a jet of singlet delta oxygen and iodine | Military lasers, scientific and materials research. Can operate in continuous wave mode, with power in the megawatt range. |
| Agil (All gas-phase iodine laser) | 1.315 μm (<70% atmospheric transmittance) | Chemical reaction of chlorine atoms with gaseous hydrazoic acid, resulting in excited molecules of nitrogen chloride, which then pass their energy to the iodine atoms. | Scientific, weaponry, aerospace. |

== Dye lasers ==
| Laser gain medium and type | Operation wavelength(s) | Pump source | Applications and notes |
|---|---|---|---|
| Dye lasers | 390-435 nm (stilbene), 460-515 nm (coumarin 102), 570-640 nm (rhodamine 6G), many others | Other laser, flashlamp | Research, laser medicine, spectroscopy, birthmark removal, isotope separation. The tuning range of the laser depends on which dye is used. |

== Metal-vapor lasers ==
| Laser gain medium and type | Operation wavelength(s) | Pump source | Applications and notes |
|---|---|---|---|
| Helium–cadmium (HeCd) metal-vapor laser | 325 nm, 441.563 nm | Electrical discharge in metal vapor mixed with helium buffer gas. | Printing and typesetting applications, fluorescence excitation examination (i.e. in U.S. paper currency printing), scientific research. |
| Helium–mercury (HeHg) metal-vapor laser | 567 nm, 615 nm | Electrical discharge in metal vapor mixed with helium buffer gas. | (Rare) Scientific research, amateur laser construction. |
| Helium–selenium (HeSe) metal-vapor laser | up to 24 wavelengths between red and UV | Electrical discharge in metal vapor mixed with helium buffer gas. | (Rare) Scientific research, amateur laser construction. |
| Helium–silver (HeAg) metal-vapor laser | 224.3 nm | Electrical discharge in metal vapor mixed with helium buffer gas. | Scientific research |
| Strontium vapor laser | 430.5 nm | Electrical discharge in metal vapor mixed with helium buffer gas. | Scientific research |
| Neon–copper (NeCu) metal-vapor laser | 248.6 nm | Electrical discharge in metal vapor mixed with neon buffer gas. | Scientific research: Raman and fluorescence spectroscopy |
| Copper vapor laser | 510.6 nm, 578.2 nm | Electrical discharge | Dermatological uses, high speed photography, pump for dye lasers. |
| Gold vapor laser | 627 nm | Electrical discharge | (Rare) Dermatological uses, photodynamic therapy. |
| Manganese (Mn/MnCl_{2}) vapor laser | 534.1 nm | Pulsed electric discharge | |

== Solid-state lasers ==
| Laser gain medium and type | Operation wavelength(s) | Pump source | Applications and notes |
|---|---|---|---|
| Ruby laser | 694.3 nm | Flashlamp | Holography, tattoo removal. The first laser, invented by Theodore Maiman in May 1960. |
| Nd:YAG laser | 1.064 μm, (1.32 μm) | Flashlamp, laser diode | Material processing, rangefinding, laser target designation, surgery, tattoo removal, hair removal, research, pumping other lasers (combined with frequency doubling to produce a green 532 nm beam). One of the most common high-power lasers. Usually pulsed (down to fractions of a nanosecond), dental laser |
| Nd:YAP laser (yttrium aluminium perovskite) | 1.0646 μm | Flashlamp, laser diode | Surgery, tattoo removal, hair removal, research, pumping other lasers (combined with frequency doubling to produce a green 532 nm beam) |
| Nd:Cr:YAG laser | 1.064 μm, (1.32 μm) | solar radiation | Experimental production of nanopowders. |
| Er:YAG laser | 2.94 μm | Flashlamp, laser diode | Periodontal scaling, dental laser, skin resurfacing |
| Neodymium YLF (Nd:YLF) solid-state laser | 1.047 and 1.053 μm | Flashlamp, laser diode | Mostly used for pulsed pumping of certain types of pulsed Ti:sapphire lasers, combined with frequency doubling. |
| Neodymium-doped yttrium orthovanadate (Nd:YVO_{4}) laser | 1.064 μm | laser diode | Mostly used for continuous pumping of mode-locked Ti:sapphire or dye lasers, in combination with frequency doubling. Also used pulsed for marking and micromachining. A frequency doubled nd:YVO_{4} laser is also the normal way of making a green laser pointer. |
| Neodymium-doped yttrium calcium oxoborate Nd:YCa_{4}O(BO_{3})_{3} or simply Nd:YCOB | ~1.060 μm (~530 nm at second harmonic) | laser diode | Nd:YCOB is a so-called "self-frequency doubling" or SFD laser material which is both capable of lasing and which has nonlinear characteristics suitable for second harmonic generation. Such materials have the potential to simplify the design of high brightness green lasers. |
| Neodymium glass (Nd:Glass) laser | ~1.062 μm (silicate glasses), ~1.054 μm (phosphate glasses) | Flashlamp, laser diode | Used in extremely high-power (terawatt scale), high-energy (megajoules) multiple beam systems for inertial confinement fusion. Nd:Glass lasers are usually frequency tripled to the third harmonic at 351 nm in laser fusion devices. |
| Titanium sapphire (Ti:sapphire) laser | 650-1100 nm | Other laser | Spectroscopy, LIDAR, research. This material is often used in highly-tunable mode-locked infrared lasers to produce ultrashort pulses and in amplifier lasers to produce ultrashort and ultra-intense pulses. |
| Thulium YAG (Tm:YAG) laser | 2.0 μm | Laser diode | LIDAR. |
| Ytterbium YAG (Yb:YAG) laser | 1.03 μm | Laser diode, flashlamp | Laser cooling, materials processing, ultrashort pulse research, multiphoton microscopy, LIDAR. |
| Ytterbium:_{2}O_{3} (glass or ceramics) laser | 1.03 μm | Laser diode | Ultrashort pulse research, |
| Ytterbium-doped glass laser (rod, plate/chip, and fiber) | 1. μm | Laser diode | Fiber version is capable of producing several-kilowatt continuous power, having ~70-80% optical-to-optical and ~25% electrical-to-optical efficiency. Material processing: cutting, welding, marking; nonlinear fiber optics: broadband fiber-nonlinearity based sources, pump for fiber Raman lasers; distributed Raman amplification pump for telecommunications. |
| Holmium YAG (Ho:YAG) laser | 2.1 μm | Flashlamp, laser diode | Tissue ablation, kidney stone removal, dentistry. |
| Chromium ZnSe (Cr:ZnSe) laser | 2.2 - 2.8 μm | Other laser (Tm fiber) | MWIR laser radar, countermeasure against heat-seeking missiles etc. |
| Cerium-doped lithium strontium (or calcium) aluminum fluoride (Ce:LiSAF, Ce:LiCAF) | ~280 to 316 nm | Frequency quadrupled Nd:YAG laser pumped, excimer laser pumped, copper vapor laser pumped. | Remote atmospheric sensing, LIDAR, optics research. |
| Promethium-147-doped phosphate glass (^{147}Pm^{+3}:Glass) solid-state laser | 933 nm, 1098 nm | ?? | Laser material is radioactive. Once demonstrated in use at LLNL in 1987, room temperature 4 level lasing in ^{147}Pm doped into a lead-indium-phosphate glass étalon. |
| Chromium-doped chrysoberyl (alexandrite) laser | Typically tuned in the range of 700 to 820 nm | Flashlamp, laser diode, mercury arc (for CW mode operation) | Dermatological uses, LIDAR, laser machining. |
| Erbium–ytterbium and Erbium-doped glass lasers | 1.53–1.56 μm | Flashlamp, laser diode | Erbium-ytterbium and erbium-doped glass lasers are made in rod, plate/chip, and optical fiber form. Common uses for Er:glass lasers include rangefinding and skin resurfacing. Erbium doped fibers are commonly used as optical amplifiers for telecommunications. |
| Trivalent uranium-doped calcium fluoride (U:CaF_{2}) solid-state laser | 2.5 μm | Flashlamp | First 4-level solid state laser (November 1960) developed by Peter Sorokin and Mirek Stevenson at IBM research labs, second laser invented overall (after Maiman's ruby laser), liquid helium cooled, unused today. |
| Divalent samarium-doped calcium fluoride (Sm:CaF_{2}) laser | 708.5 nm | Flashlamp | Also invented by Peter Sorokin and Mirek Stevenson at IBM research labs, early 1961. Liquid helium-cooled, unused today. |
| F-center laser | 2.3-3.3 μm | Ion laser | Spectroscopy |
| Optically pumped semiconductor laser | 920 nm-1.35 μm | Laser diode | Projection, life sciences, forensic analysis, spectroscopy, eye surgery, laser light shows. The lasing medium is a semiconductor chip. Frequency doubling or tripling is typically done to produce visible or ultraviolet radiation. Power levels of several watts are possible. Beam quality can be extremely high- often rivaling that of an ion laser. |

== Semiconductor lasers ==
| Laser gain medium and type | Operation wavelength(s) | Pump source | Applications and notes |
|---|---|---|---|
| Semiconductor laser diode (general information) | 0.4-20 μm, depending on active region material. | Electrical current | Telecommunications, holography, printing, weapons, machining, welding, pump sources for other lasers, high-beam headlights for automobiles. |
| GaN | 0.4 μm | Electrical current | Optical discs. 405 nm is used in Blu-ray Discs reading/recording. |
| InGaN | 0.4 - 0.5 μm | Electrical current | Home projector, primary light source for some recent small projectors |
| AlGaInP, AlGaAs | 0.63-0.9 μm | Electrical current | Optical discs, laser pointers, data communications. 780 nm compact disc, 650 nm general DVD player and 635 nm DVD for Authoring recorder laser are the most common lasers type in the world. Solid-state laser pumping, machining, medical. |
| InGaAsP | 1.0-2.1 μm | Electrical current | Telecommunications, solid-state laser pumping, machining, medical.. |
| lead salt | 3-20 μm | Electrical current | |
| Vertical-cavity surface-emitting laser (VCSEL) | 850–1500 nm, depending on material | Electrical current | Telecommunications |
| Quantum cascade laser | Mid-infrared to far-infrared. | Electrical current | Research, Future applications may include collision-avoidance radar, industrial-process control and medical diagnostics such as breath analyzers. |
| Quantum dot laser | wide range. | Electrical current | Medicine (laser scalpel, optical coherence tomography), display technologies (projection, laser TV), spectroscopy and telecommunications. |
| Quantum well laser | 0.4-20 μm, depending on active region material. | Electrical current | Telecommunications |
| Hybrid silicon laser | Mid-infrared | Electrical current | Low cost silicon integrated optical communications |

== Other types of lasers ==
| Laser gain medium and type | Operation wavelength(s) | Pump source | Applications and notes |
|---|---|---|---|
| Free-electron laser | A broad wavelength range (0.1 nm - several mm); a single FEL may be tunable over a wavelength range | Relativistic electron beam | Atmospheric research, material science, medical applications. |
| CO₂ gas dynamic laser | Several lines around 10.5 μm; other frequencies may be possible with different gas mixtures | Spin state population inversion in carbon dioxide molecules caused by supersonic adiabatic expansion of mixture of nitrogen and carbon dioxide | Military applications; can operate in CW mode at several megawatts optical power. Manufacturing and Heavy Industry. |
| "Nickel-like" samarium laser | X-rays at 7.3 nm wavelength | Lasing in ultra-hot samarium plasma formed by double pulse terawatt scale irradiation fluences. | Sub–10 nm X-ray laser, possible applications in high-resolution microscopy and holography. |
| Raman lasers, use inelastic stimulated Raman scattering in a nonlinear media, mostly fiber, for amplification | 1-2 μm for fiber version | Other laser, mostly Yb-glass fiber lasers | Complete 1-2 μm wavelength coverage; distributed optical signal amplification for telecommunications; optical solitons generation and amplification |
| Nuclear pumped laser | See gas lasers, soft x-ray | Nuclear fission: reactor, nuclear bomb | Research, weapons program. |
| Polariton laser | Near infrared | optically and electrically pumped | spin switches and terahertz lasers |
| Plasmonic laser | Near infrared and ultraviolet | optically pumped | Nanoscale lithography, fabrication of ultra-fast photonic nano circuits, single-molecule biochemical sensing, and microscopy |
| Phonon laser | microwave to Far-infrared | electrically pumped | Investigation of terahertz-frequency ultrasound and optoelectronics |
| Gamma-ray laser | Gamma rays | Unknown | Hypothetical |

== See also ==
- Laser construction
- List of laser articles
- Maser producing or amplifying a coherent microwave beam
- X-ray laser producing a coherent x-ray or EUV beam
- Atom laser producing a coherent beam of atoms
- Gravity laser, a hypothetical concept of producing coherent gravitation waves

== Further references ==
- Silfvast, William T. Laser fundamentals, Cambridge University Press, 2004. ISBN 0-521-83345-0
- Weber, Marvin J. Handbook of laser wavelengths, CRC Press, 1999. ISBN 0-8493-3508-6
