= Laser Inertial Fusion Energy =

Early 2010s fusion energy effort

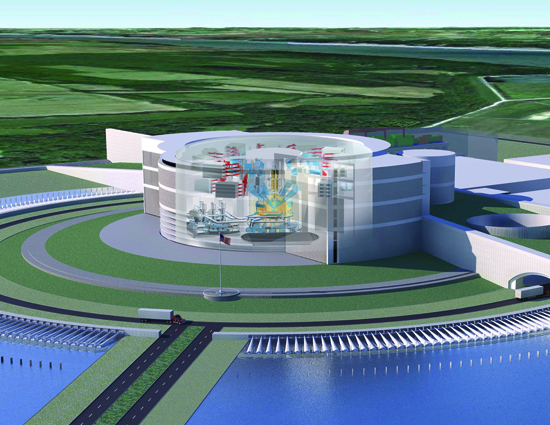
Rendering of the LIFE.1 fusion power plant. The fusion system is in the large cylindrical containment building in the center.

LIFE, short for Laser Inertial Fusion Energy, was a fusion energy effort run at Lawrence Livermore National Laboratory between 2008 and 2013. LIFE aimed to develop the technologies necessary to convert the laser-driven inertial confinement fusion concept being developed in the National Ignition Facility (NIF) into a practical commercial power plant, a concept known generally as inertial fusion energy (IFE). LIFE used the same basic concepts as NIF, but aimed to lower costs using mass-produced fuel elements, simplified maintenance, and diode lasers with higher electrical efficiency.

Two designs were considered, operated as either a pure fusion or hybrid fusion-fission system. In the former, the energy generated by the fusion reactions is used directly. In the latter, the neutrons given off by the fusion reactions are used to cause fission reactions in a surrounding blanket of uranium or other nuclear fuel, and those fission events are responsible for most of the energy release. In both cases, conventional steam turbine systems are used to extract the heat and produce electricity.

Construction on NIF completed in 2009 and it began a lengthy series of run-up tests to bring it to full power. Through 2011 and into 2012, NIF ran the "national ignition campaign" to reach the point at which the fusion reaction becomes self-sustaining, a key goal that is a basic requirement of any practical IFE system. NIF failed in this goal, with fusion performance that was well below ignition levels and differing considerably from predictions. With the problem of ignition unsolved, the LIFE project was canceled in 2013.

The LIFE program was criticized through its development for being based on physics that had not yet been demonstrated. In one pointed assessment, Robert McCrory, director of the Laboratory for Laser Energetics, stated: "In my opinion, the overpromising and overselling of LIFE did a disservice to Lawrence Livermore Laboratory."

== Background ==
Lawrence Livermore National Laboratory (LLNL) has been a leader in laser-driven inertial confinement fusion (ICF) since the initial concept was developed by LLNL employee John Nuckols in the late 1950s. The basic idea was to use a driver to compress a small pellet known as the target that contains the fusion fuel, a mix of deuterium (D) and tritium (T). If the compression reaches high enough values, fusion reactions begin to take place, releasing alpha particles and neutrons. The alphas may impact atoms in the surrounding fuel, heating them to the point where they undergo fusion as well. If the rate of alpha heating is higher than heat losses to the environment, the result is a self-sustaining chain reaction known as ignition.

Comparing the driver energy input to the fusion energy output produces a number known as fusion energy gain factor, labelled Q. A Q value of at least 1 is required for the system to produce net energy. Since some energy is needed to run the reactor, in order for there to be net electrical output, Q has to be at least 3. For commercial operation, Q values much higher than this are needed. For ICF, Qs on the order of 25 to 50 are needed to recoup both the electrical generation losses and the large amount of power used to power the driver. In the fall of 1960, theoretical work carried out at LLNL suggested that gains of the required order would be possible with drivers on the order of 1 MJ.

At the time, a number of different drivers were considered, but the introduction of the laser later that year provided the first obvious solution with the right combination of features. The desired energies were well beyond the state of the art in laser design, so LLNL began a development program in the mid-1960s to reach these levels. Each increase in energy led to new and unexpected optical phenomena that had to be overcome, but these were largely solved by the mid-1970s. Working in parallel with the laser teams, physicists studying the expected reaction using computer simulations adapted from thermonuclear bomb work developed a program known as LASNEX that suggested Q of 1 could be produced at much lower energy levels, in the kilojoule range, levels that the laser team were now able to deliver.

From the late-1970s, LLNL developed a series of machines to reach the conditions being predicted by LASNEX and other simulations. With each iteration, the experimental results demonstrated that the simulations were incorrect. The first machine, the Shiva laser of the late 1970s, produced compression on the order of 50 to 100 times, but did not produce fusion reactions anywhere near the expected levels. The problem was traced to the issue of the infrared laser light heating electrons and mixing them in the fuel, and it was suggested that using ultraviolet light would solve the problem. This was addressed on the Nova laser of the 1980s, which was designed with the specific intent of producing ignition. Nova did produce large quantities of fusion, with shots producing as much as 10^{7} neutrons, but failed to reach ignition. This was traced to the growth of Rayleigh–Taylor instabilities, which greatly increased the required driver power.

Ultimately all of these problems were considered to be well understood, and a much larger design emerged, NIF. NIF was designed to provide about twice the required driver energy, allowing some margin of error. NIF's design was finalized in 1994, with construction to be completed by 2002. Construction began in 1997 but took over a decade to complete, with major construction being declared complete in 2009.

== LIFE ==
Throughout the development of the ICF concept at LLNL and elsewhere, several small efforts had been made to consider the design of a commercial power plant based on the ICF concept. Examples include SOLASE-H and HYLIFE-II. As NIF was reaching completion in 2008, with the various concerns considered solved, LLNL began a more serious IFE development effort, LIFE.

=== Fusion–fission hybrid ===
When the LIFE project was first proposed, it focused on the nuclear fusion–fission hybrid concept, which uses the fast neutrons from the fusion reactions to induce fission in fertile nuclear materials. The hybrid concept was designed to generate power from both fertile and fissile nuclear fuel and to burn nuclear waste. The fuel blanket was designed to use TRISO-based fuel cooled by a molten salt made from a mixture of lithium fluoride (LiF) and beryllium fluoride (BeF_{2}).

Conventional fission power plants rely on the chain reaction caused when fission events release thermal neutrons that cause further fission events. Each fission event in U-235 releases two or three neutrons with about 2 MeV of kinetic energy. By careful arrangement and the use of various absorber materials, designers can balance the system so one of those neutrons causes another fission event while the other one or two are lost. This balance is known as criticality. Natural uranium is a mix of three isotopes; mainly U-238, with some U-235, and trace amounts of U-234. The neutrons released in the fission of either of the main isotopes will cause fission in U-235, but not in U-238, which requires higher energies around 5 MeV. There is not enough U-235 in natural uranium to reach criticality. Commercial light-water nuclear reactors, the most prevalent power reactors in the world, use nuclear fuel containing uranium enriched to 3 to 5% U-235 while the leftover is U-238.

Each fusion event in the D-T fusion reactor gives off an alpha particle and a fast neutron with around 14 MeV of kinetic energy. This is enough energy to cause fission in U-238, and many other transuranic elements as well. This reaction is used in H-bombs to increase the yield of the fusion section by wrapping it in a layer of depleted uranium, which undergoes rapid fission when hit by the neutrons from the fusion bomb inside. The same basic concept can also be used with a fusion reactor like LIFE, using its neutrons to cause fission in a blanket of fission fuel. Unlike a fission reactor, which burns out its fuel once the U-235 drops below a certain threshold value, (Note: Or, more typically, when the products of previous fission events "poison" the ongoing reaction by capturing neutrons.) these fission–fusion hybrid reactors can continue producing power from the fission fuel as long as the fusion reactor continues to provide neutrons. As the neutrons have high energy, they can potentially cause multiple fission events, leading to the reactor as a whole producing more energy, a concept known as energy multiplication. Even leftover nuclear fuel taken from conventional nuclear reactors will burn in this fashion. This is potentially attractive because this burns off many of the long lived radioisotopes in the process, producing waste that is only mildly radioactive and lacking most long-lived components.

In most fusion energy designs, fusion neutrons react with a blanket of lithium to breed new tritium for fuel. A major issue with the fission–fusion design is that the neutrons causing fission are no longer available for tritium breeding. While the fission reactions release additional neutrons, these do not have enough energy to complete the breeding reaction with Li-7, which makes up more than 92% of natural lithium. These lower energy neutrons will cause breeding in Li-6, which could be concentrated from the natural lithium ore. However, the Li-6 reaction only produces one tritium per neutron captured, and more than one T per neutron is needed to make up for natural decay and other losses. Using Li-6, neutrons from the fission would make up for the losses, but only at the cost of removing them from causing other fission reactions, lowering the reactor power output. The designer has to choose which is more important; burning up the fuel through fusion neutrons, or providing power through self-induced fission events.

The economics of fission–fusion designs have always been questionable. The same basic effect can be created by replacing the central fusion reactor with a specially designed fission reactor, and using the surplus neutrons from the fission to breed fuel in the blanket. These fast breeder reactors have proven uneconomical in practice, and the greater expense of the fusion systems in the fission–fusion hybrid has always suggested they would be uneconomical unless built in very large units.

=== Pure IFE ===
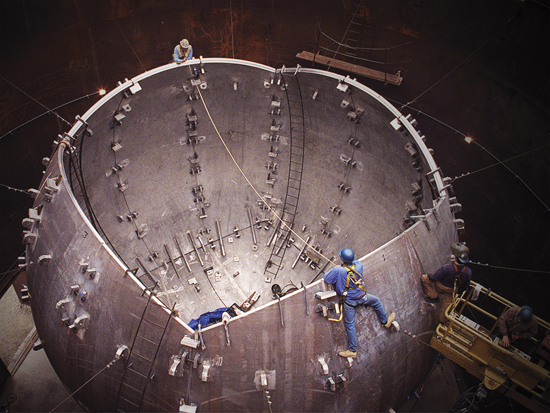
The National Ignition Facility's target chamber's multi-part construction would also be used in LIFE. Several chambers would be used in a production power plant, allowing them to be swapped out for maintenance.

The LIFE concept stopped working along fusion-fission lines around 2009. Following consultations with their partners in the utility industry, the project was redirected toward a pure fusion design with a net electrical output around 1 gigawatt.

Inertial confinement fusion is one of two major lines of fusion power development, the other being magnetic confinement fusion (MCF), notably the tokamak concept which is being built in a major experimental system known as ITER. Magnetic confinement is widely considered to be the superior approach, and has seen significantly greater development activity over the decades. However, there are serious concerns that the MCF approach of ITER cannot ever become economically practical.

One of the cost concerns for MCF designs like ITER is that the reactor materials are subject to the intense neutron flux created by the fusion reactions. When high-energy neutrons impact materials they displace the atoms in the structure leading to a problem known as neutron embrittlement that degrades the structural integrity of the material. This is a problem for fission reactors as well, but the neutron flux and energy in a tokamak is greater than most fission designs. In most MFE designs, the reactor is constructed in layers, with a toroidal inner vacuum chamber, or "first wall", then the lithium blanket, and finally the superconducting magnets that produce the field that confines the plasma. Neutrons stopping in the blanket are desirable, but those that stop in the first wall or magnets degrade them. Disassembling a toroidal stack of elements would be a time-consuming process that would lead to poor capacity factor, which has a significant impact on the economics of the system. Reducing this effect requires the use of exotic materials which have not yet been developed.

As a natural side-effect of the size of the fuel elements and their resulting explosions, ICF designs use a very large reaction chamber many meters across. This lowers the neutron flux on any particular part of the chamber wall through the inverse-square law. Additionally, there are no magnets or other complex systems near or inside the reactor, and the laser is isolated on the far side of long optical paths. The far side of the chamber is empty, allowing the blanket to be placed there and easily maintained. Although the reaction chamber walls and final optics would eventually embrittle and require replacement, the chamber is essentially a large steel ball of relatively simple multi-piece construction that could be replaced without too much effort. The reaction chamber is, on the whole, dramatically simpler than those in magnetic fusion concepts, and the LIFE designs proposed building several and quickly moving them in and out of production.

=== IFE limitations ===
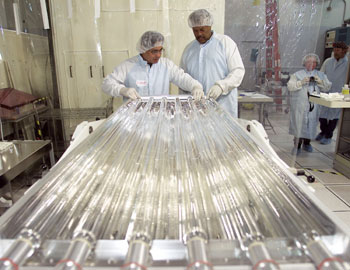
NIF's huge flashlamps are both inefficient and impractical. LIFE explored solutions to replace these lamps with smaller and much more efficient LED-pumped lasers.

NIF's laser uses a system of large flashtubes (like those in a photography flashlamp) to optically pump a large number of glass plates. Once the plates are flashed and have settled into a population inversion, a small signal from a separate laser is fed into the optical lines, stimulating the emission in the plates. The plates then dump their stored energy into the growing beam, amplifying it billions of times.

The process is extremely inefficient in energy terms; NIF feeds the flashtubes over 400 MJ of energy which produces 1.8 MJ of ultraviolet (UV) light. Due to limitations of the target chamber, NIF is only able to handle fusion outputs up to about 50 MJ, although shots would generally be about half of that. Accounting for losses in generation, perhaps 20 MJ of electrical energy might be extracted at the maximum, accounting for less than 1/20 of the input energy.

Another problem with the NIF lasers is that the flashtubes create a significant amount of heat, which warms the laser glass enough to cause it to deform. This requires a lengthy cooling-off period between shots, on the order of 12 hours. In practice, NIF manages a shot rate of less than one shot per day. To be useful as a power plant, about a dozen shots would have to take place every second, well beyond the capabilities of the NIF lasers.

When originally conceived by Nuckols, laser-driven inertial fusion confinement was expected to require lasers of a few hundred kilojoules and use fuel droplets created by a perfume mister arrangement. LLNLs research since that time has demonstrated that such an arrangement cannot work, and requires machined assemblies for each shot. To be economically useful, an IFE machine would need to use fuel assemblies that cost pennies. Although LLNL does not release prices for their own targets, the similar system at the Laboratory for Laser Energetics at the University of Rochester makes targets for about $1 million each. It is suggested that NIF's targets cost more than $10,000.

=== Mercury ===
LLNL had begun exploring different solutions to the laser problem while the system was first being described. In 1996 they built a small testbed system known as the Mercury laser that replaced the flashtubes with laser diodes.

One advantage of this design was that the diodes created light around the same frequency as the laser glass' output, as compared to the white light flashtubes where most of the energy in the flash was wasted as it was not near the active frequency of the laser glass. This change increased the energy efficiency to about 10%, a dramatic improvement.

For any given amount of light energy created, the diode lasers give off about 1/3 as much heat as a flashtube. Less heat, combined with active cooling in the form of helium blown between the diodes and the laser glass layers, eliminated the warming of the glass and allows Mercury to run continually. In 2008, Mercury was able to fire 10 times a second at 50 joules per shot for hours at a time.

Several other projects running in parallel with Mercury explored various cooling methods and concepts allowing many laser diodes to be packed into a very small space. These eventually produced a system with 100 kW of laser energy from a box about 50 centimetres (20 in) long, known as a diode array. In a LIFE design, these arrays would replace the less dense diode packaging of the Mercury design.

=== Beam-in-a-box ===
LIFE was essentially a combination of the Mercury concepts and new physical arrangements to greatly reduce the volume of the NIF while making it much easier to build and maintain. Whereas an NIF beamline for one of its 192 lasers is over 100 metres (330 ft) long, LIFE was based on a design about 10.5 metres (34 ft) long that contained everything from the power supplies to frequency conversion optics. Each module was completely independent, unlike NIF which is fed from a central signal from the Master Oscillator, allowing the units to be individually removed and replaced while the system as a whole continued operation.

Each driver cell in the LIFE baseline design contained two of the high-density diode arrays arranged on either side of a large slab of laser glass. The arrays were provided cooling via hook-up pipes at either end of the module. The initial laser pulse was provided by a preamplifier module similar to the one from the NIF, the output of which was switched into the main beamline via a mirror and Pockels cell optical switch. To maximize the energy deposited into the beam from the laser glass, optical switches were used to send the beam to mirrors to reflect the light through the glass four times, in a fashion similar to NIF. Finally, focussing and optical cleanup was provided by optics on either side of the glass, before the beam exited the system through a frequency converter at one end.

The small size and independence of the laser modules allowed the huge NIF building to be dispensed with. Instead, the modules were arranged in groups surrounding the target chamber in a compact arrangement. In baseline designs, the modules were stacked in 2-wide by 8-high groups in two rings above and below the target chamber, shining their light through small holes drilled into the chamber to protect them from the neutron flux coming back out.

The ultimate goal was to produce a system that could be shipped in a conventional semi-trailer truck to the power plant, providing laser energy with 18% end-to-end efficiency, 15 times that of the NIF system. This reduces the required fusion gains into the 25 to 50 area, within the predicted values for NIF. The consensus was that this "beam-in-a-box" system could be built for 3 cents per Watt of laser output, and that would reduce to 0.7 cents/W in sustained production. This would mean that a complete LIFE plant would require about $600 million worth of diodes alone, significant, but within the realm of economic possibility.

=== Inexpensive targets ===
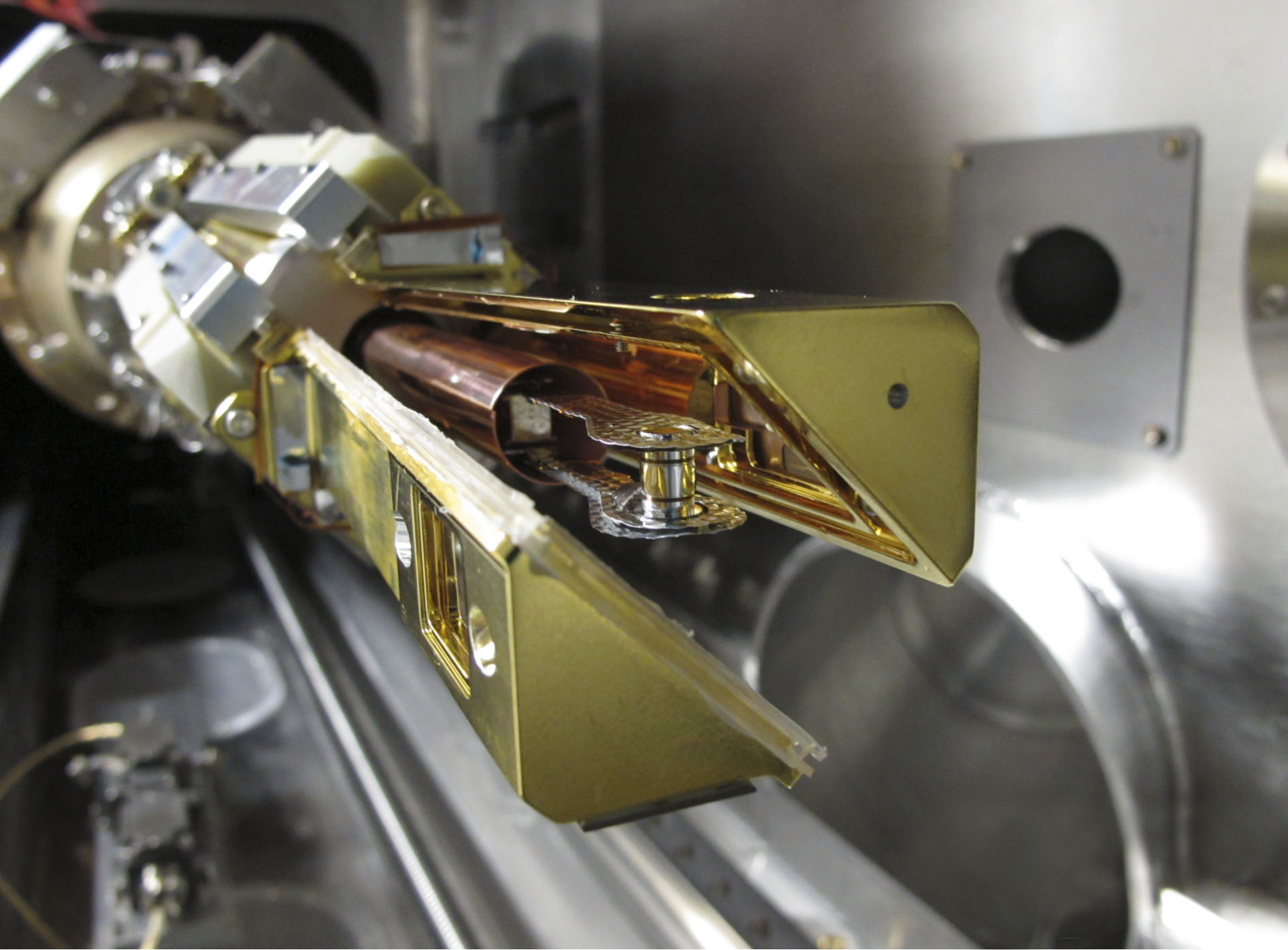
NIF's targets (centered, in the holder) are expensive machined assemblies that cost thousands of dollars each. LIFE worked with industry partners to reduce this to under a dollar.

Targets for NIF are extremely expensive. Each one consists of a small open-ended metal cylinder with transparent double-pane windows sealing each end. In order to efficiently convert the driver laser's light to the x-rays that drive the compression, the cylinder has to be coated in gold or other heavy metals. Inside, suspended on fine plastic wires, is a hollow plastic sphere containing the fuel. In order to provide symmetrical implosion, the metal cylinder and plastic sphere have extremely high machining tolerances. The fuel, normally a gas at room temperature, is deposited inside the sphere and then cryogenically frozen until it sticks to the inside of the sphere. It is then smoothed by slowly warming it with an infrared laser to form a 100 μm smooth layer on the inside of the pellet. Each target costs tens of thousands of dollars.

To address this concern, a considerable amount of LIFE's effort was put into the development of simplified target designs and automated construction that would lower their cost. Working with General Atomics, the LIFE team developed a concept using on-site fuel factories that would mass-produce pellets at a rate of about a million a day. It was expected that this would reduce their price to about 25 cents per target, although other references suggest the target price was closer to 50 cents, and LLNL's own estimates range from 20 to 30 cents.

One less obvious advantage to the LIFE concept is that the amount of tritium required to start the system up is greatly reduced over MFE concepts. In MFE, a relatively large amount of fuel is prepared and put into the reactor, requiring much of the world's entire civilian tritium supply just for startup. LIFE, by virtue of the tiny amount of fuel in any one pellet, can begin operations with much less tritium, on the order of 1/10.

=== Overall design ===
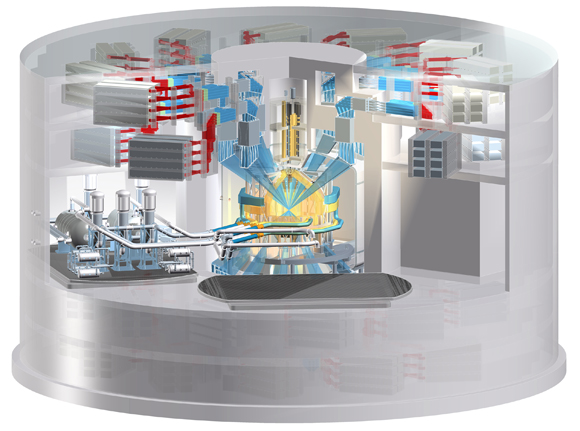
LIFE.1/MEP's fusion system. The lasers are the grey boxes arranged in groups at the top and bottom of the containment building (the lower ones are just visible). Their light, in blue, is bounced through the optical paths into the target chamber in the center. The machinery on the left circulates the liquid lithium or FLiBe, which removes heat from the chamber to cool it, provides heat to the generators, and extracts tritium for fuel.

The early fusion-fission designs were not well developed and only schematic outlines of the concept were shown. These systems looked like a scaled down version of NIF, with beamlines about 100 metres (330 ft) long on either side of a target chamber and power generation area. The laser produced 1.4 MJ of UV light 13 times a second. The fusion took place in a 2.5 metres (8 ft 2 in) target chamber that was surrounded by 40 short tons (36,000 kg) of unenriched fission fuel, or alternately about 7 short tons (6,400 kg) of Pu or highly enriched uranium from weapons. The fusion system was expected to produce Q on the order of 25 to 30, resulting in 350 to 500 MW of fusion energy. The fission processes triggered by the fusion would add an additional energy gain of 4 to 10 times, resulting in a total thermal output between 2000 and 5000 MW_{th}. Using high efficiency thermal-to-electric conversion systems like Rankine cycle designs in combination with demonstrated supercritical steam generators would allow about half of the thermal output to be turned into electricity.

By 2012, the baseline design of the pure fusion concept, known as the Market Entry Plant (MEP), (Note: Referred to as LIFE.1 in other documents.) had stabilized. This was a self-contained design with the entire fusion section packaged into a cylindrical concrete building not unlike a fission reactor confinement building, although larger at 100 metres (330 ft) diameter. The central building was flanked by smaller rectangular buildings on either side, one containing the turbines and power handling systems, the other the tritium plant. A third building, either attached to the plant or behind it depending on the diagram, was used for maintenance.

Inside the central fusion building, the beam-in-a-box lasers were arranged in two rings, one above and one below the target chamber. A total of 384 lasers would provide 2.2 MJ of UV light at a 0.351-micrometer wavelength, producing a Q of 21. A light-gas gun was used to fire 15 targets a second into the target chamber. With each shot, the temperature of the target chamber's inner wall is raised from 600 °C (1,112 °F) to 800 °C (1,470 °F).

The target chamber is a two-wall structure filled with liquid lithium or a lithium alloy between the walls. The lithium captures neutrons from the reactions to breed tritium, and also acts as the primary coolant loop. The chamber is filled with xenon gas that would slow the ions from the reaction as well as protect the inner wall, or first wall, from the massive x-ray flux. Because the chamber is not highly pressurized, like a fission core, it does not have to be built as a single sphere. Instead, the LIFE chamber is built from eight identical sections that include built-in connections to the cooling loop. They are shipped to the plant and bolted together on two supports, and then surrounded by a tube-based space frame.

To deal with embrittlement, the entire target chamber was designed to be easily rolled out of the center of the building on rails to the maintenance building where it could be rebuilt. The chamber was expected to last four years, and be replaced in one month. The optical system is decoupled from the chamber, which isolates it from vibrations during operation and means that the beamlines themselves do not have to be realigned after chamber replacement.

The plant had a peak generation capability, or nameplate capacity, of about 400 MWe, with design features to allow expansion to as much as 1000 MWe.

== Economics ==
LIFE plant parameters (MEP: prototype ; LIFE.2: first generation commercial plant)
	MEP	LIFE.2
Laser energy on target, MJ	2.2	2.2
Target yield, MJ	132	132
Pulse repetition rate, Hz	8.3	16.7
Fusion power, MW	1100	2200
Thermal power, MWt	1320	2640
Chamber material	RAFMS (Note: RAFMS stands for Reduced Activation Ferritic/Martensitic Steel.)	ODS
First wall radius, m	6.0	6.0
Neutron wall load, MW/m^{2}	1.8	3.6
Surface heat load, MW/m^{2}	0.63	1.26
Tritium breeding ratio	1.05	1.05
Primary coolant	Li	Li
Intermediate coolant	Molten salt	Molten salt
Chamber outlet temperature, °C	530	575
Conversion efficiency, %	45	47
Gross power, MWe	595	1217
Laser electrical power input, MWe	124	248
In-plant power load, MWe	34	64
Net electric power, MWe	437	905

The levelized cost of electricity (LCoE) can be calculated by dividing the total cost to build and operate a power-generating system over its lifetime by the total amount of electricity shipped to the grid during that period. The amount of money is essentially a combination of the capital expense (CAPEX) of the plant and the interest payments on that CAPEX, and the discounted cost of the fuel, the maintenance needed to keep it running and its dismantling, the discounted operational expenses, or OPEX. The amount of power is normally calculated by considering the peak power the plant could produce, and then adjusting that by the capacity factor (CF) to account for downtime due to maintenance or deliberate throttling. As a quick calculation, one can ignore inflation, opportunity costs and minor operational expenses to develop a figure of merit for the cost of electricity.

MEP was not intended to be a production design, and would be able to export only small amounts of electricity. It would, however, serve as the basis for the first production model, LIFE.2. LIFE.2 would produce 2.2 GW of fusion energy and convert that to 1 GW of electrical at 48% efficiency. Over a year, LIFE would produce 365 days x 24 hours x 0.9 capacity factor x 1,000,000 kW nameplate rating = 8 billion kWh. In order to generate that power, the system will have to burn 365 x 24 x 60 minutes x 60 seconds x 15 pellets per second x 0.9 capacity = 425 million fuel pellets. If the pellets cost the suggested price of 50 cents each, that is over $200 million a year to fuel the plant. The average rate for wholesale electricity in the US as of 2015 is around 5 cents/kWh, so this power has a commercial value of about $212 million, suggesting that LIFE.2 would just barely cover, on average, its own fuel costs. (Note: Wholesale prices have dropped since 2015, as of 2018, the average cost is closer to 3 cents/kWh, which means LIFE.2 would lose money even at the cheapest possible target prices.)

CAPEX for the plant is estimated to $6.4 billion, so financing the plant over a 20-year period adds another $5 billion assuming the 6.5% unsecured rate. Considering CAPEX and fuel alone, the total cost of the plant is 6.4 + 5 + 4 = $15.4 billion. Dividing the total cost by the energy produced over the same period gives a rough estimate of the cost of electricity for a 20-year lifetime operation: $15.4 billion / 160 billion kWh = 9.6 cents/kWh. A 40-year operation lifetime would lead to a cost of electricity of 4.8 cents/kWh. LLNL calculated the LCOE of LIFE.2 at 9.1 cents using the discounted cash flow methodology described in the 2009 MIT report "the Future of Nuclear Energy". Using either value, LIFE.2 would be unable to compete with modern renewable energy sources, which are well below 5 cents/kWh as of 2018.

LLNL projected that further development after widespread commercial deployment might lead to further technology improvements and cost reductions, and proposed a LIFE.3 design of about $6.3 billion CAPEX and 1.6 GW nameplate for a price per watt of $4.2/W. This leads to a projected LCOE of 5.5 cents/kWh, which is competitive with offshore wind as of 2018, but unlikely to be so in 2040 when LIFE.3 designs would start construction. (Note: LCoE on wind turbines declined (improved) by 58% between 2009 and 2014, to just over 5.5 cents/kWh.) LIFE plants would be wholesale sellers, competing against a baseload rate of about 5.3 cents/kWh as of 2015.

The steam turbine section of a power plant, the turbine hall, generally costs about $1/W, and the electrical equipment to feed that power to the grid is about another $1/W. To reach the projected total CAPEX quoted in LIFE documents, this implies that the entire nuclear island has to cost around $4/W for LIFE.2, and just over $2/W for LIFE.3. Modern nuclear plants, benefiting from decades of commercial experience and continuous design work, cost just under $8/W, with approximately half of that in the nuclear island. LLNL's estimates require LIFE.3 to be built in 2040 for about half the cost of a fission plant today.

== End of LIFE ==
NIF construction was completed in 2009 and the lab began a long calibration and setup period to bring the laser to its full capacity. The plant reached its design capacity of 1.8 MJ of UV light in 2012. During this period, NIF began running a staged program known as the National Ignition Campaign, with the goal of reaching ignition by 30 September 2012. Ultimately, the campaign failed as unexpected performance problems arose that had not been predicted in the simulations. By the end of 2012 the system was producing best-case shots that were still 1/10 of the pressures needed to achieve ignition.

During a progress review after the end of the Campaign, a National Academy of Sciences review board stated that "The appropriate time for the establishment of a national, coordinated, broad-based inertial fusion energy program within DOE is when ignition is achieved." They noted that "the panel assesses that ignition using laser indirect drive is not likely in the next several years."

The LIFE effort was quietly cancelled in early 2013. LLNL's acting director, Bret Knapp, commented on the issue stating that "The focus of our inertial confinement fusion efforts is on understanding ignition on NIF rather than on the LIFE concept. Until more progress is made on ignition, we will direct our efforts on resolving the remaining fundamental scientific challenges to achieving fusion ignition."
