= Barbara Lasinski =

American physicist

Barbara F. Lasinski is a retired American physicist whose research focused on modeling and simulating the interactions between high-powered laser light and plasma. She worked as a researcher at the Lawrence Livermore National Laboratory on inertial confinement fusion projects including the Laser Inertial Fusion Energy effort and the National Ignition Facility.

Lasinski began working for John Nuckolls at the Lawrence Livermore National Laboratory in the 1970s. She was elected as a Fellow of the American Physical Society (APS) in 2002, after a nomination from the APS Division of Plasma Physics, "for development and application of particle-in-cell codes for laser-plasma interaction physics, and a long series of contributions to the understanding of the physics of targets for high-power laser experiments". In 2023 she was part of a group of researchers honored by Lawrence Livermore with a Director’s Science and Technology Award for achieving ignition in the National Ignition Facility.
