= Łasiński =

Łasiński or Lasinski is a surname of Polish origin. Notable people with the surname include:

- Barbara Lasinski, American laser physicist
- Donna Lasinski (born 1968), American politician and Michigan representative
- Edmund Łasiński (1874–1935), Polish inventor, teacher at Karol Marcinkowski High School
- John Lasinski, 1936 US national amateur boxing light heavyweight champion

== See also ==
- Starofarny Cemetery in Bydgoszcz, housing a chapel of the Łasiński family
