= LASNEX =

Simulation software

LASNEX is a computer program that simulates the interactions between x-rays and a plasma, along with many effects associated with these interactions. The program is used to predict the performance of inertial confinement fusion (ICF) devices such as the Nova laser or proposed particle beam "drivers". Versions of LASNEX have been used since the late 1960s or early 1970s, and the program has been constantly updated. LASNEX's existence was mentioned in John Nuckolls' seminal paper in Nature in 1972 that first widely introduced the ICF concept, saying it was "...like breaking an enemy code. It tells you how many divisions to bring to bear on a problem."

LASNEX uses a 2-dimensional finite element method (FEM) for calculations, breaking down the experimental area into a grid of arbitrary polygons. Each node on the grid records values for various parameters in the simulation. Values for thermal (low-energy) electrons and ions, super-thermal (high-energy and relativistic) electrons, x-rays from the laser, reaction products and the electric and magnetic fields were all stored for each node. The simulation engine then evolves the system forward through time, reading values from the nodes, applying formulas, and writing them back out. The process is very similar to other FEM systems, like those used in aerodynamics.

In spite of numerous problems in very early ICF research, LASNEX offered clear suggestions that slight increases in performance would be all that was needed to reach ignition. By the late 1970s further work with LASNEX indicated that the issue was not energy as much as the number of laser beams, and suggested that the Shiva laser with 10 kJ of energy in 20 beams would reach ignition. It did not, failing to contain the Rayleigh–Taylor instability. A review of the progress by The New York Times the following year noted that the system "fell short of the more optimistic estimates by a factor of 10,000".

Real-world results from the Shiva project were then used to tune the LASNEX code, which now predicted that a somewhat larger machine, the Nova laser, would reach ignition. It did not; although Nova demonstrated fusion reactions on a large scale, it was far from ignition.

Nova's results were also used to tune the LASNEX system, which once again predicted that ignition could be reached, this time with a significantly larger machine. Given the past failures and rising costs, the Department of Energy decided to directly test the concept with a series of underground nuclear tests known as "Halite" and "Centurion", depending on which lab was handling the experiment. Halite/Centurion placed typical ICF targets in hohlraums, metal cylinders intended to smooth out the driver's energy so it shines on the fuel target evenly. The hohlraum/fuel assemblies were then placed at various distances from a small atomic bomb, detonation of which released significant quantities of x-rays. These x-rays heated the hohlraums until they glowed in the x-ray spectrum (having been heated "x-ray hot" as opposed to "white hot") and it was this smooth x-ray illumination that started the fusion reactions within the fuel. These results demonstrated that the amount of energy needed to cause ignition was approximately 100 MJ, about 25 times greater than any machine that was being considered.

The data from Halite/Centurion was used to further tune LASNEX, which then predicted that careful shaping of laser pulse would reduce the energy required by a factor of about 100 times, between 1 and 2 MJ, so a design with a total output of 4 MJ began to be on the safe side. This emerged as the National Ignition Facility concept. In 2022, NIF achieved ignition, triggering a self-sustaining fusion reaction which released 3.15 MJ of energy using 2.05 MJ of laser energy.

For these reasons, LASNEX is somewhat controversial in the ICF field. More accurately, LASNEX generally predicted a device's low-energy behaviour quite closely, but becomes increasingly inaccurate as the energy levels are increased.

Advanced 3D versions of the same basic concept, like ICF3D and HYDRA, continue to drive modern ICF design, and likewise have failed to closely match experimental performance.
