= Hohlraum =

Idealised cavity in radiative equilibrium

In radiation thermodynamics, a Hohlraum (German: [ˈhoːlˌʁaʊ̯m]; a non-specific German word for a "hollow space", "empty room", or "cavity") is a cavity whose walls are in radiative equilibrium with the radiant energy within the cavity. First proposed by Gustav Kirchhoff in 1860 and used in the study of black-body radiation (Hohlraumstrahlung), this idealized cavity can be approximated in practice by a hollow container of any opaque material. The radiation escaping through a small perforation in the wall of such a container will be a good approximation of black-body radiation at the temperature of the interior of the container. Indeed, a Hohlraum can even be constructed from cardboard, as shown by Purcell's Black Body Box, a Hohlraum demonstrator.

In spectroscopy, the Hohlraum effect occurs when an object achieves thermodynamic equilibrium with an enclosing Hohlraum. As a consequence of Kirchhoff’s law, everything optically blends, and the contrast between the walls and the object effectively disappears.

== Applications ==
Hohlraums are used in high energy density physics (HEDP) and inertial confinement fusion (ICF) experiments to convert laser energy to thermal X-rays for imploding capsules, heating targets, and generating thermal radiation waves. They may also be used in nuclear weapon designs.

=== Inertial confinement fusion ===
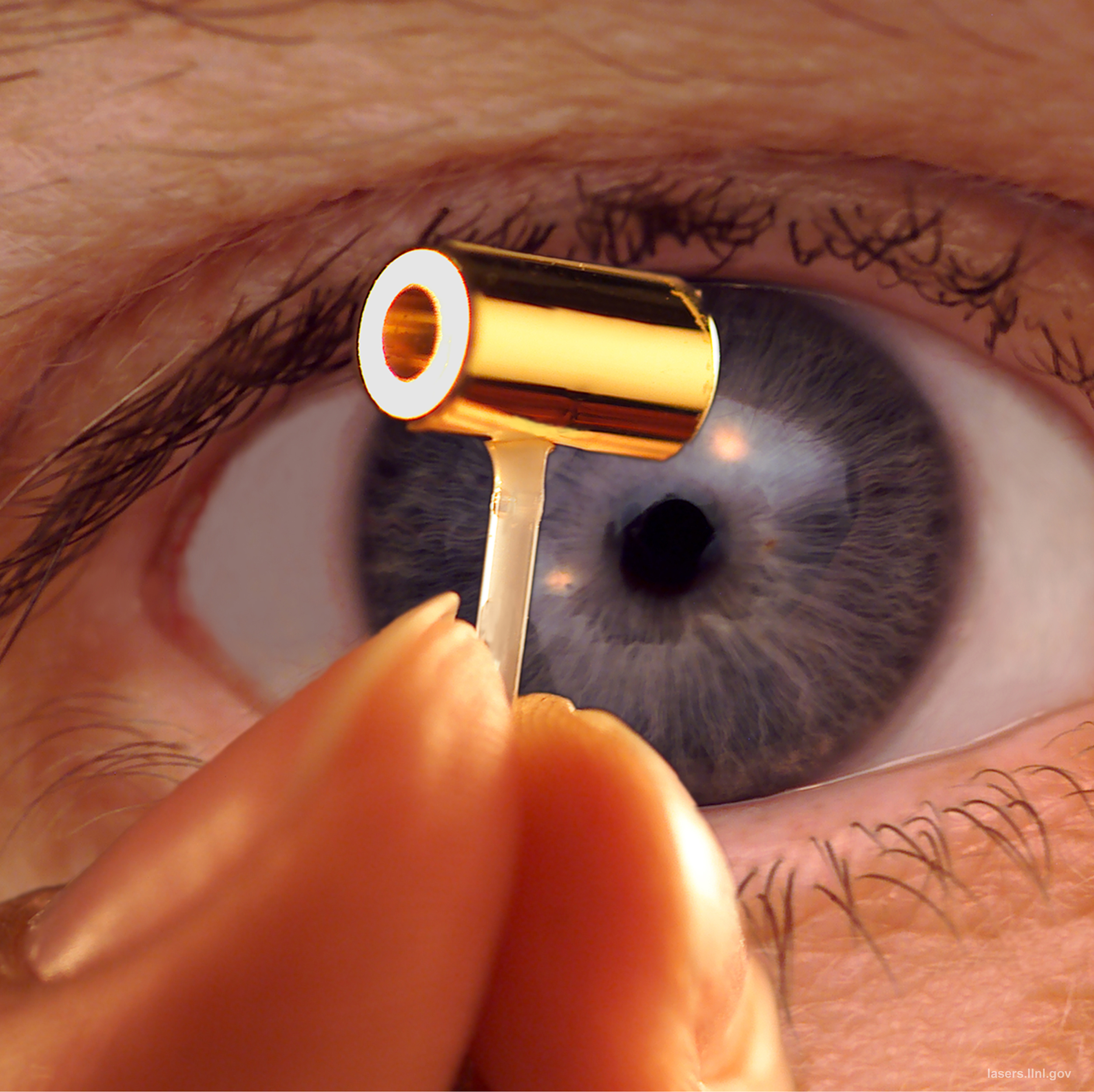
Mockup of a gold-plated Hohlraum designed for use in the National Ignition Facility (NIF) at Lawrence Livermore National Laboratory

Diagram of a hohlraum with lasers illuminating the inside to compress a spherical fuel capsule

One approach to inertial confinement fusion is the indirect drive approach. In it, a fusion fuel capsule is held inside a cylindrical Hohlraum.

The fuel capsule is a sphere with 3 layers. In the middle is a ball of gaseous deuterium and tritium (D-T) fuel. Outside of that is a thin layer of D-T ice, adhering to the outermost layer. The outermost layer is a solid spherical shell made of light elements such as plastic, beryllium, or diamond (called "high-density carbon", or HDC).

The hohlraum is a hollow cylinder with two openings at its two ends. It is made of a high-Z (high atomic number) element, usually gold or uranium.

During a fusion reaction, a radiation source (usually laser) is shot into the Hohlraum at an angle through its two openings. The radiation avoids the fuel capsule and hits the walls of the hohlraum. The Hohlraum absorbs and re-radiates the energy as X-rays. The outer portion of the fuel capsule explodes outward when ablated by the X-rays produced by the Hohlraum wall upon irradiation by lasers. Due to Newton's third law, the inner portion of the fuel capsule implodes, causing the D-T fuel to be supercompressed, activating a nuclear fusion reaction.

This process is called the "indirect" drive, because the lasers, instead of directly driving fusion, heats up the hohlraum and thus fill the hohlraum with a uniform high-temperature photon gas, which then in turn drives fusion. The advantage of this approach, compared to direct drive, is that high-mode structures from the laser spot are smoothed out when the energy is re-radiated from the Hohlraum walls. The disadvantage of this approach is that low-mode asymmetries are more complex to control. It is essential to be able to control both high-mode and low-mode asymmetries to achieve a uniform implosion.

The Hohlraum walls must have surface roughness less than 1 micron, and hence accurate machining is required during fabrication. Any imperfection of the wall during fabrication will cause uneven and non-symmetrical compression of the fuel capsule inside the Hohlraum during inertial confinement fusion (ICF). Hence, imperfections are to be carefully avoided, so surface finishing is critical, as during ICF laser shots, due to the intense pressure and temperature, results are highly susceptible to Hohlraum texture roughness. The fuel capsule must be precisely spherical, with texture roughness less than one nanometer, for fusion ignition to start. Otherwise, instability will cause fusion to fizzle. The fuel capsule contains a small fill hole with a diameter of less than 5 microns to inject D-T gas into the capsule.

The X-ray intensity around the capsule must be very symmetrical to avoid hydrodynamic instabilities during compression. Earlier designs had radiators at the ends of the Hohlraum, but maintaining adequate X-ray symmetry proved difficult with this geometry. By the end of the 1990s, target physicists developed a new family of designs in which the ion beams are absorbed in the Hohlraum walls, so that X-rays are radiated from a significant fraction of the solid angle surrounding the capsule. With a judicious choice of absorbing materials, this arrangement, referred to as a "distributed-radiator" target, gives better X-ray symmetry and target gain in simulations than earlier designs.

=== Nuclear weapon design ===
The term hohlraum is also used to describe the casing of a thermonuclear bomb following the Teller-Ulam design. The casing's purpose is to contain and focus the energy of the primary (fission) stage to implode the secondary (fusion) stage.

== See also ==
- Nuclear physics
- Thermodynamics
