= Burning plasma =

Plasma whose heat comes from fusion reactions

In plasma physics, a burning plasma is a plasma that is heated primarily by fusion reactions involving thermal plasma ions. The Sun and similar stars are a burning plasma, and in 2020 the National Ignition Facility achieved a burning plasma in the laboratory. A closely related concept is that of an ignited plasma, in which all of the heating comes from fusion reactions.

== The Sun ==
The Sun and other main sequence stars are internally heated by fusion reactions involving hydrogen ions. The high temperatures needed to sustain fusion reactions are maintained by a self-heating process in which energy from the fusion reaction heats the thermal plasma ions via particle collisions. A plasma enters what scientists call the burning plasma regime when the self-heating power exceeds any external heating.

The Sun is a burning plasma that has reached fusion ignition, meaning the Sun's plasma temperature is maintained solely by energy released from fusion. The Sun has been burning hydrogen for 4.5 billion years and is about halfway through its life cycle.

== Thermonuclear weapons ==
Thermonuclear weapons, also known as hydrogen bombs, are nuclear weapons that use energy released by a burning plasma's fusion reactions to produce part of their explosive yield. This is in contrast to pure-fission weapons, which produce all of their yield from a neutronic nuclear fission reaction. The first thermonuclear explosion, and thus the first man-made burning plasma, was the Ivy Mike test carried out by the United States in 1952. All high-yield nuclear weapons today are thermonuclear weapons.

== The National Ignition Facility ==
In 2020, a burning plasma was created in the laboratory for the first time at the National Ignition Facility, a large laser-based inertial confinement fusion research device located at the Lawrence Livermore National Laboratory in Livermore, California. NIF achieved a fully ignited plasma on August 8, 2021, and a scientific energy gain above one on December 5, 2022.

== Tokamaks ==
Multiple tokamaks are currently under construction with the goal of becoming the first magnetically confined burning plasma experiment.

ITER, being built near Cadarache in France, has the stated goal of allowing fusion scientists and engineers to investigate the physics, engineering, and technologies associated with a self-heating plasma. Issues to be explored include understanding and controlling a strongly coupled, self-organized plasma; management of heat and particles that reach plasma-facing surfaces; demonstration of fuel breeding technology; and the physics of energetic particles. These issues are relevant to ITER's broader goal of using self-heating plasma reactions to become the first fusion energy device that produces more power than it consumes, a major step toward commercial fusion power production. To reach fusion-relevant temperatures, the ITER tokamak will heat plasmas using three methods: ohmic heating (running electric current through the plasma), neutral particle beam injection, and high-frequency electromagnetic radiation.

SPARC, being built in Devens in the United States, plans to verify the technology and physics required to build a power plant based on the ARC fusion power plant concept. SPARC is designed to achieve this with margin in excess of breakeven and may be capable of achieving up to 140 MW of fusion power for 10-second bursts despite its relatively compact size. SPARC's high-temperature superconductor magnet is intended to create much stronger magnetic fields, allowing it to be much smaller than similar tokamaks.

== Symbolic implications ==
The NIF burning plasma, despite not occurring in an energy context, has been characterised as a major milestone in the race towards nuclear fusion power, with the perception that it could bring with it a better planet. The first controlled burning plasma has been characterized as a critical juncture on the same level as the Trinity Test, with enormous implications for fusion for energy (fusion power), including the weaponization of fusion power, mainly for electricity for directed-energy weapons, as well as fusion for peacebuilding – one of the main tasks of ITER.
