= Mercury laser =

Laser system developed by Lawrence Livermore National Laboratory

The Mercury laser is a high-average-power laser system developed at Lawrence Livermore National Laboratory as a prototype for systems to drive inertial confinement fusion. Like the National Ignition Facility, it is intended to produce narrow pulses of extremely high power, using diode-pumped solid-state lasers. Unlike the NIF system, the Mercury laser aims to achieve a high repetition rate: its goals are 10 pulses per second, each delivering 100 J with a 10% efficient conversion of electricity to laser light.

The active gain medium is Yb:SFAP (Ytterbium-doped strontium fluorapatite, Sr_{5}(PO_{4})_{3}F), which is cooled by fast-flowing helium to allow high repetition rates. Infrared light at 900 nm from 8 arrays of laser diodes pumps the laser.
