= National Ignition Facility =

American nuclear fusion facility

Coordinates: 37°41′27″N 121°42′02″W

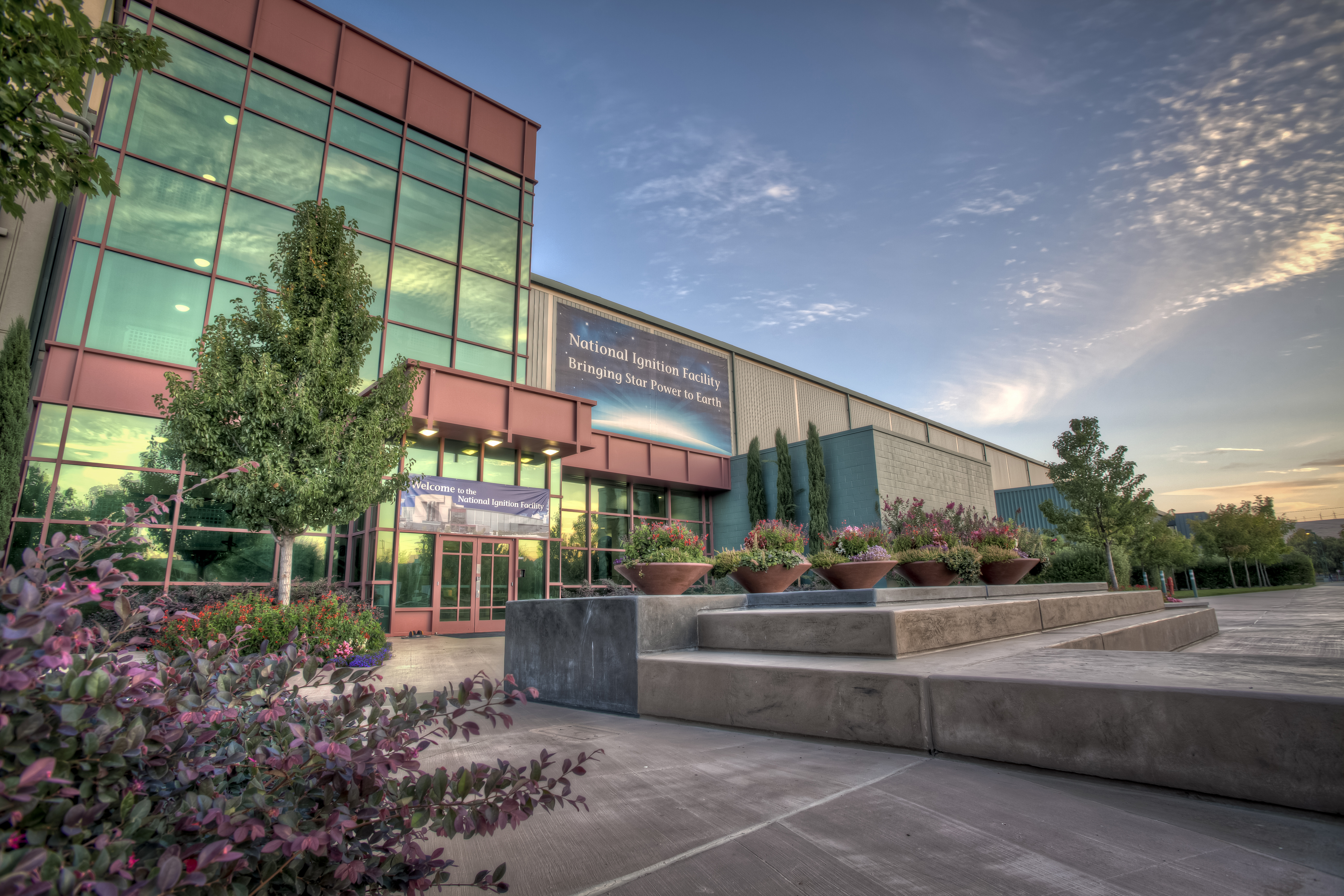
The National Ignition Facility, located at Lawrence Livermore National Laboratory

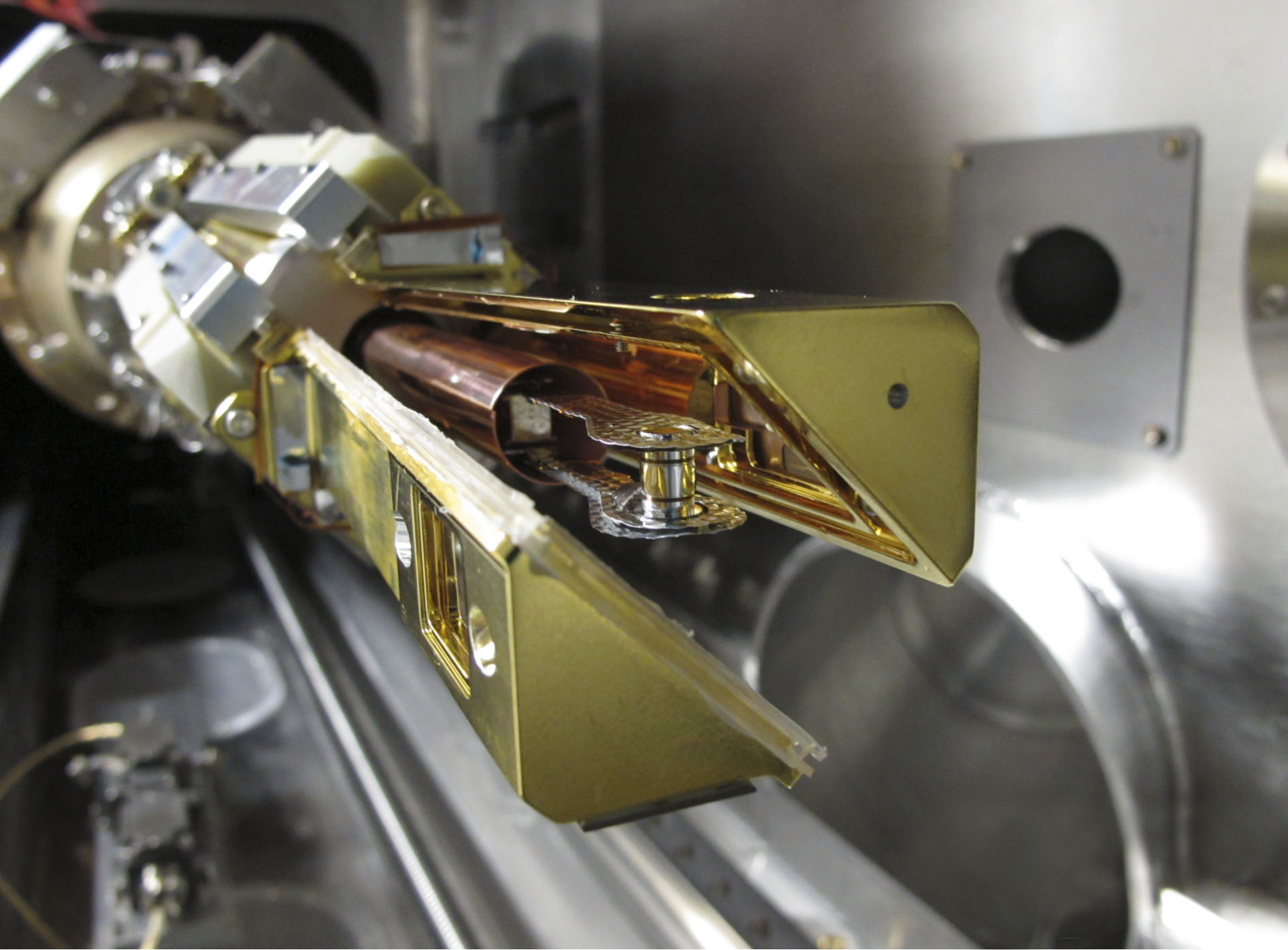
The target assembly for NIF's first integrated ignition experiment is mounted in the cryogenic target positioning system, or cryoTARPOS. The two triangle-shaped arms form a shroud around the cold target to protect it until they open five seconds before a shot.

The National Ignition Facility (NIF) is a laser-based inertial confinement fusion (ICF) research facility, located at Lawrence Livermore National Laboratory in Livermore, California, United States. NIF's mission is to achieve fusion ignition with high energy gain. It achieved the first instance of scientific breakeven controlled fusion in an experiment on December 5, 2022, with an energy gain factor of 1.5. It supports nuclear weapon maintenance and design by studying the behavior of matter under the conditions found within nuclear explosions.

NIF is the largest and most powerful ICF device built to date. The basic ICF concept is to squeeze a small amount of fuel to reach the pressure and temperature necessary for fusion. NIF hosts the world's most energetic laser, which indirectly heats the outer layer of a small sphere. The energy is so intense that it causes the sphere to implode, squeezing the fuel inside. The implosion reaches a peak speed of 350 km/s (0.35 mm/ns), raising the fuel density from about that of water to about 100 times that of lead. The delivery of energy and the adiabatic process during implosion raises the temperature of the fuel to hundreds of millions of degrees. At these temperatures, fusion processes occur in the tiny interval before the fuel explodes outward.

Construction on the NIF began in 1997. NIF was completed five years behind schedule and cost almost four times its original budget. Construction was certified complete on March 31, 2009, by the U.S. Department of Energy. The first large-scale experiments were performed in June 2009 and the first "integrated ignition experiments" (which tested the laser's power) were declared completed in October 2010.

From 2009 to 2012 experiments were conducted under the National Ignition Campaign, with the goal of reaching ignition just after the laser reached full power, some time in the second half of 2012. The campaign officially ended in September 2012, at about 1/10 the conditions needed for ignition. Thereafter NIF has been used primarily for materials science and weapons research.

In 2021, after improvements in fuel target design, a NIF experiment produced 70% of the energy of the laser, beating the energy gain record set in 1997 by the JET reactor at 67% and achieving the first ignited plasma in a laboratory. On December 5, 2022, after further technical improvements, NIF reached scientific breakeven for the first time, producing 154% of the energy of the laser. While this was scientifically a success, the experiment produced less than 1% of the energy the facility used to create it: while 3.15 MJ of energy was yielded from 2.05 MJ input, the 2.05 MJ laser pulse took about 300 MJ to produce. Subsequent shots have seen continued increases in yield; a February 2024 shot exceeded 5 MJ.

== Inertial confinement fusion basics ==
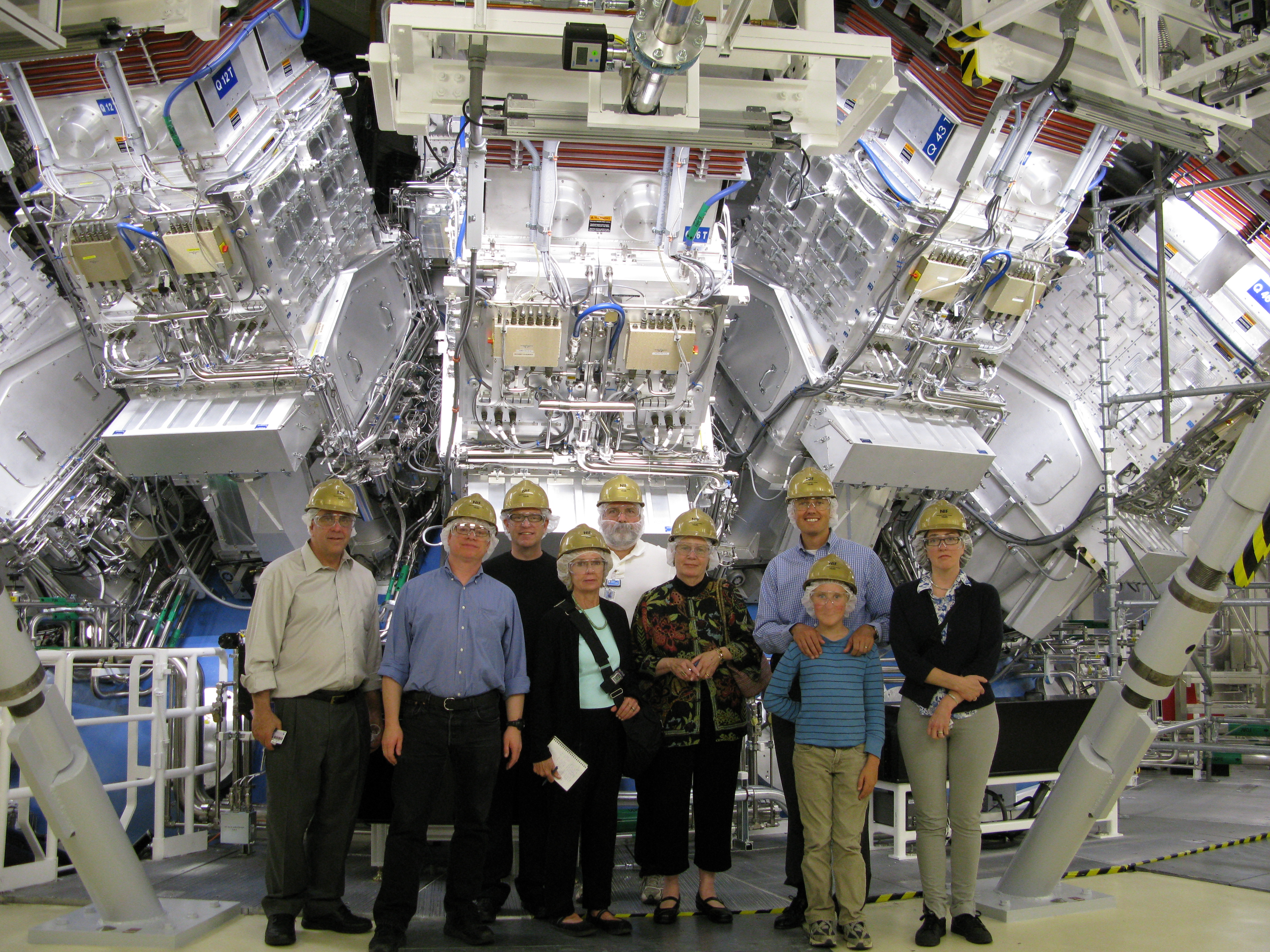
Photo taken outside the target chamber

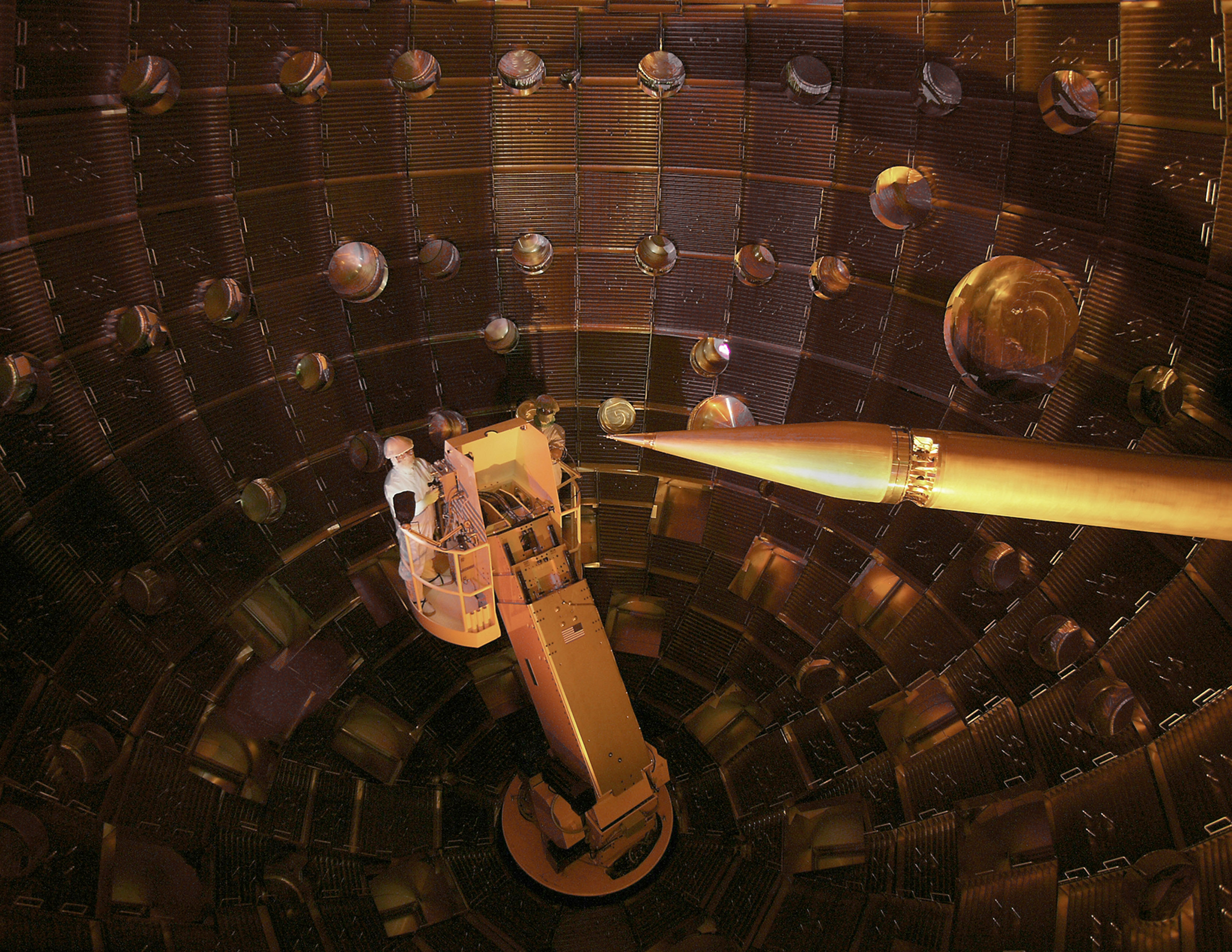
Photo taken inside the target chamber

Inertial confinement fusion (ICF) devices use intense energy to rapidly heat the outer layers of a target in order to compress it. Nuclear fission provides the energy source for thermonuclear warheads, while sources such as laser beams and particle beams are used in non-weapon devices.

The target is a small spherical pellet containing a few milligrams of fusion fuel, typically a mix of deuterium (D) and tritium (T), as this composition has the lowest ignition temperature.

The lasers can either heat the surface of the fuel pellet directly – known as direct drive – or heat the inner surface of a hollow metal cylinder around the pellet – known as indirect drive. In the indirect drive case, the cylinder, called a hohlraum (German for 'hollow room' or 'cavity'), becomes hot enough to re-emit the energy as even higher frequency X-rays. These X-rays, which are more symmetrically distributed than the original laser light, heat the surface of pellet.

In either case, the material on the outside of the pellet is turned into a plasma, which explodes away from the surface. The rest of the pellet is driven inward on all sides, into a small volume of extremely high density. The surface explosion creates shock waves that travel inward. At the center of the fuel, a small volume is further heated and compressed. When the temperature and density are high enough, fusion reactions occur. The energy must be delivered quickly and spread extremely evenly across the target's outer surface in order to compress the fuel symmetrically.

The reactions release high-energy particles, some of which, primarily alpha particles, collide with unfused fuel and heat it further, potentially triggering additional fusion. At the same time, the fuel is also losing heat through x-ray losses and hot electrons leaving the fuel area. Thus the rate of alpha heating must be greater than the loss rate, termed bootstrapping. Given the right conditions—high enough density, temperature, and duration—bootstrapping results in a chain reaction, burning outward from the center. This is known as ignition, which fuses a significant portion of the fuel and releases large amounts of energy.

As of 1998, most ICF experiments had used laser drivers. Other drivers have been examined, such as heavy ions driven by particle accelerators.

== Design ==
=== System ===
Sankey diagram of the laser energy to hohlraum x-ray to target capsule energy coupling efficiency. Note the "laser energy" is after conversion to UV, which loses about 50% of the original IR power. The conversion of x-ray heat to energy in the fuel loses another 90% – of the 1.9 MJ of laser light, only about 10 kJ ends up in the fuel itself.

NIF primarily uses the indirect drive method of operation, in which the laser heats a small metal cylinder surrounding the capsule inside it, which then emits X-rays that heat the fuel pellet. Experimental systems, including the OMEGA and Nova lasers, validated this approach. The NIF's high power supports a much larger target than OMEGA or Nova; the baseline pellet design is about 2 mm in diameter. It is chilled to about 18 kelvin (−255 °C) and lined with a layer of frozen deuterium–tritium (DT) fuel. The hollow interior contains a small amount of DT gas.

In a typical experiment, the laser generates 3 MJ of infrared laser energy of a possible 4. About 1.5 MJ remains after conversion to UV, and another 15 percent is lost in the hohlraum. About 15 percent of the resulting x-rays, about 150 kJ, are absorbed by the target's outer layers. The coupling between the capsule and the x-rays is lossy, and ultimately only about 10 to 14 kJ of energy is deposited in the fuel.

The fuels in the center of the target are compressed to a density of about 1000 g/cm^{3.} For comparison, lead has a density of about 11 g/cm^{3}. The pressure is the equivalent of 300 billion atmospheres.

Before NIF was constructed, it was expected based on simulations that 10–15 MJ of fusion energy would be released, resulting in a net fusion energy gain, denoted Q, of about 5–8 (fusion energy out/UV laser energy in). Due to the design of the target chamber, the baseline design limited the maximum possible fusion energy release to 45 MJ, equivalent to about 11 kg of TNT exploding. When NIF was built and used in 2011, the fusion energy was far lower than expected – less than 1 kJ. Performance was gradually improved until, as of 2024, the fusion energy routinely exceeded 2 MJ.

To be useful for energy production, a fusion facility must produce fusion output at least an order of magnitude more than the energy used to power the laser amplifiers – 400 MJ in the case of NIF. Commercial laser fusion systems would use much more efficient diode-pumped solid state lasers, where wall-plug efficiencies of 10 percent have been demonstrated, and efficiencies 16–18 percent were expected with advanced concepts under development in 1996.

=== Laser ===
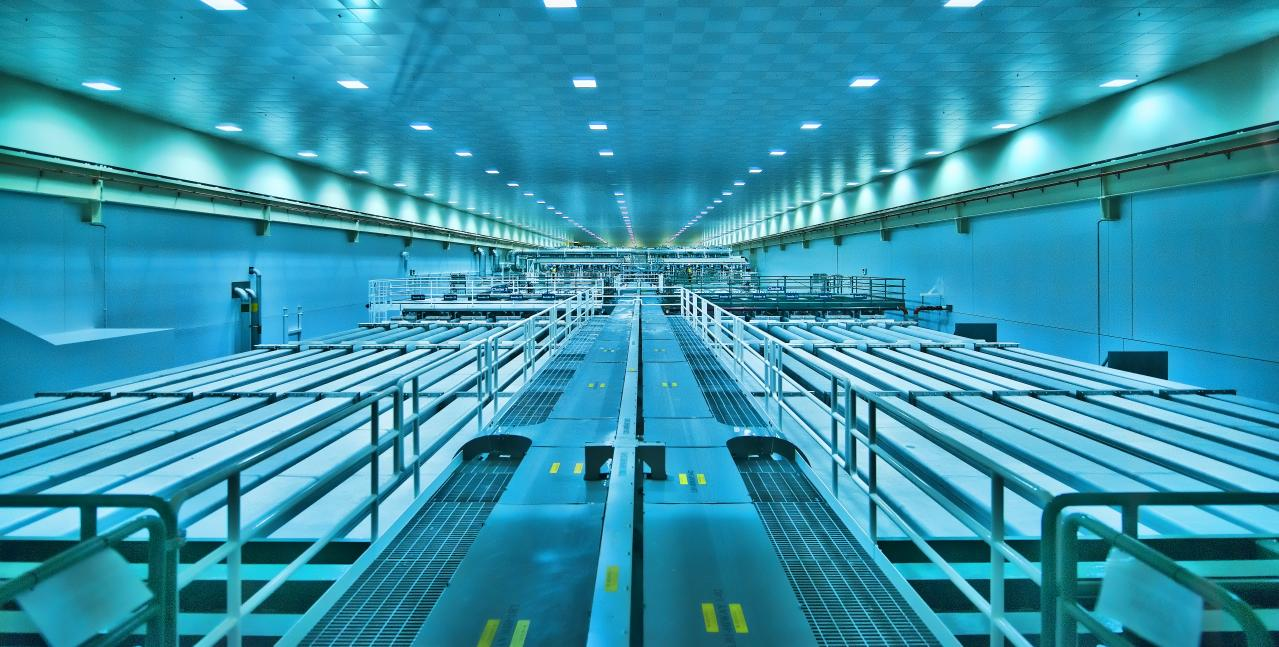
One of the rooms in which the laser is amplified

As of 2010 NIF aimed to create a single 500 terawatt (TW) peak flash of light that reaches the target from numerous directions within a few picoseconds. The design uses 192 beamlines in a parallel system of flashlamp-pumped, neodymium-doped phosphate glass lasers.

To ensure that the output of the beamlines is uniform, the laser is amplified from a single source in the Injection Laser System (ILS). This starts with a low-power flash of 1053-nanometer (nm) infrared light generated in an ytterbium-doped optical fiber laser termed Master Oscillator. Its light is split and directed into 48 Preamplifier Modules (PAMs). Each PAM conducts a two-stage amplification process via xenon flash lamps. The first stage is a regenerative amplifier in which the pulse circulates 30 to 60 times, increasing its energy from nanojoules to tens of millijoules. The second stage sends the light four times through a circuit containing a neodymium glass amplifier similar to (but much smaller than) the ones used in the main beamlines, boosting the millijoules to about 6 joules. According to LLNL, designing the PAMs was one of the major challenges. Subsequent improvements allowed them to surpass their initial design goals.

The main amplification takes place in a series of glass amplifiers located at one end of the beamlines. Before firing, the amplifiers are first optically pumped by a total of 7,680 flash lamps. The lamps are powered by a capacitor bank that stores 400 MJ (110 kWh). When the wavefront passes through them, the amplifiers release some of the energy stored in them into the beam. The beams are sent through the main amplifier four times, using an optical switch located in a mirrored cavity. These amplifiers boost the original 6 J to a nominal 4 MJ. Given the time scale of a few nanoseconds, the peak UV power delivered to the target reaches 500 TW.

Near the center of each beamline, and taking up the majority of the total length, are spatial filters. These consist of long tubes with small telescopes at the end that focus the beam to a tiny point in the center of the tube, where a mask cuts off any stray light outside the focal point. The filters ensure that the beam image is extremely uniform. Spatial filters were a major step forward. They were introduced in the Cyclops laser, an earlier LLNL experiment.

The end-to-end length of the path the laser beam travels, including switches, is about 1,500 metres (4,900 ft). The various optical elements in the beamlines are generally packaged into Line Replaceable Units (LRUs), standardized boxes about the size of a vending machine that can be dropped out of the beamline for replacement from below.

After amplification is complete the light is switched back into the beamline, where it runs to the far end of the building to the target chamber. The target chamber is a 10-metre-diameter (33 ft) multi-piece steel sphere weighing 130,000 kilograms (290,000 lb). Just before reaching the target chamber, the light is reflected off mirrors in the switchyard and target area in order to hit the target from different directions. Since the path length from the Master Oscillator to the target is different for each beamline, optics are used to delay the light in order to ensure that they all reach the center within a few picoseconds of each other.

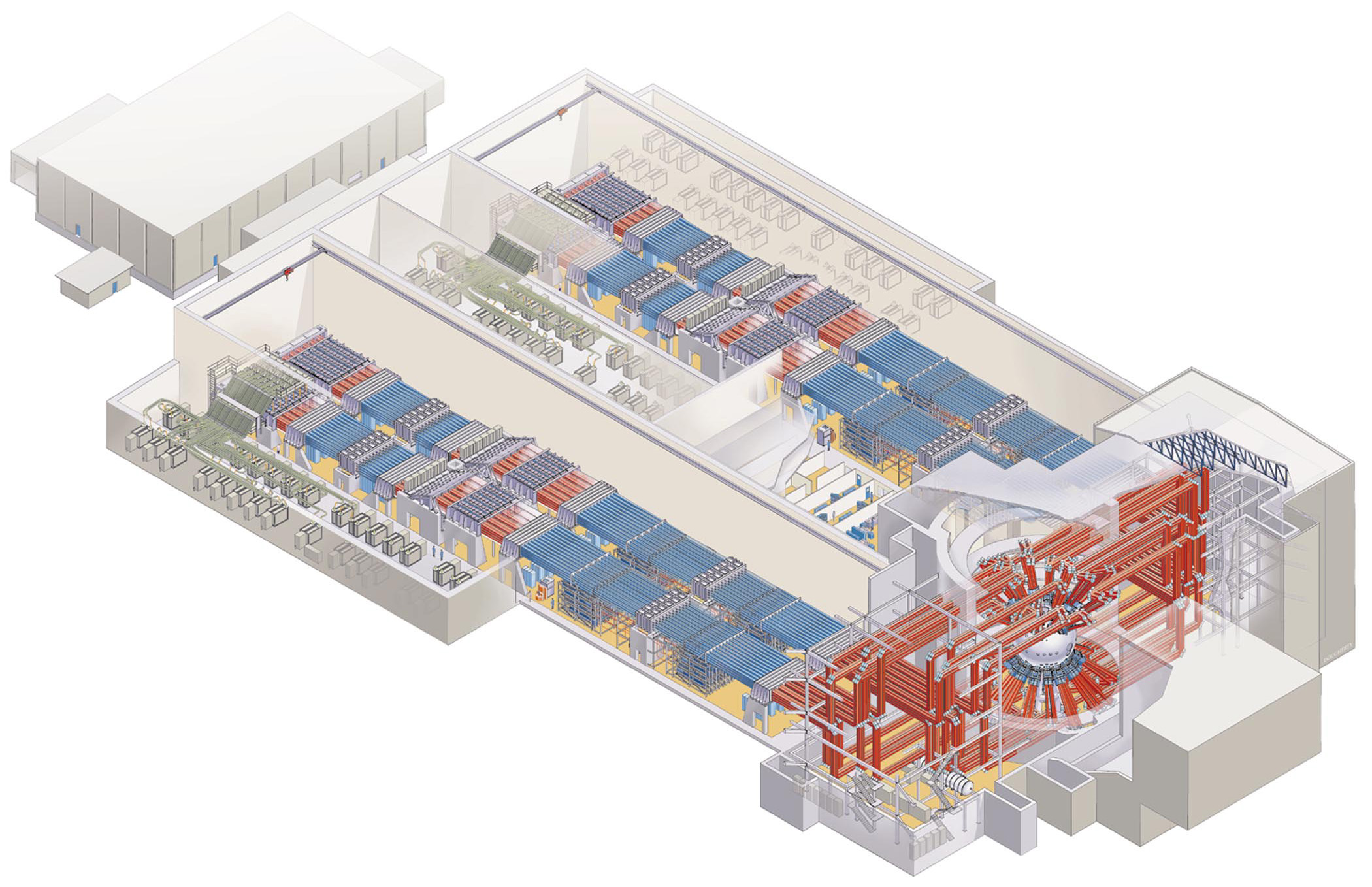
NIF's basic layout. The laser pulse is generated in the room just right of center, and is sent into the beamlines (blue) on either side. After several passes through the beamlines the light is sent into the "switchyard" (red) where it is aimed into the target chamber (silver).

One of the last steps before reaching the target chamber is to convert the infrared (IR) light at 1053 nm into the ultraviolet (UV) at 351 nm in a device known as a frequency converter. These are made of thin sheets (about 1 cm thick) cut from a single crystal of potassium dihydrogen phosphate. When the 1053 nm (IR) light passes through the first of two of these sheets, frequency addition converts a large fraction of the light into 527 nm light (green). On passing through the second sheet, frequency combination converts much of the 527 nm light and the remaining 1053 nm light into 351 nm (UV) light. Infrared (IR) light is much less effective than UV at heating the targets, because IR couples more strongly with hot electrons that absorb a considerable amount of energy and interfere with compression. The conversion process can reach peak efficiencies of about 80 percent for a laser pulse that has a flat temporal shape, but the temporal shape needed for ignition varies significantly over the duration of the pulse. The actual conversion process is about 50 percent efficient, reducing delivered energy to a nominal 1.8 MJ.

As of 2010, one important aspect of any ICF research project was ensuring that experiments could be carried out on a timely basis. Previous devices generally had to cool down for many hours to allow the flashlamps and laser glass to regain their shapes after firing (due to thermal expansion), limiting their use to one or fewer firings per day. One of the goals for NIF has been to reduce this time to less than four hours, in order to allow 700 firings a year.

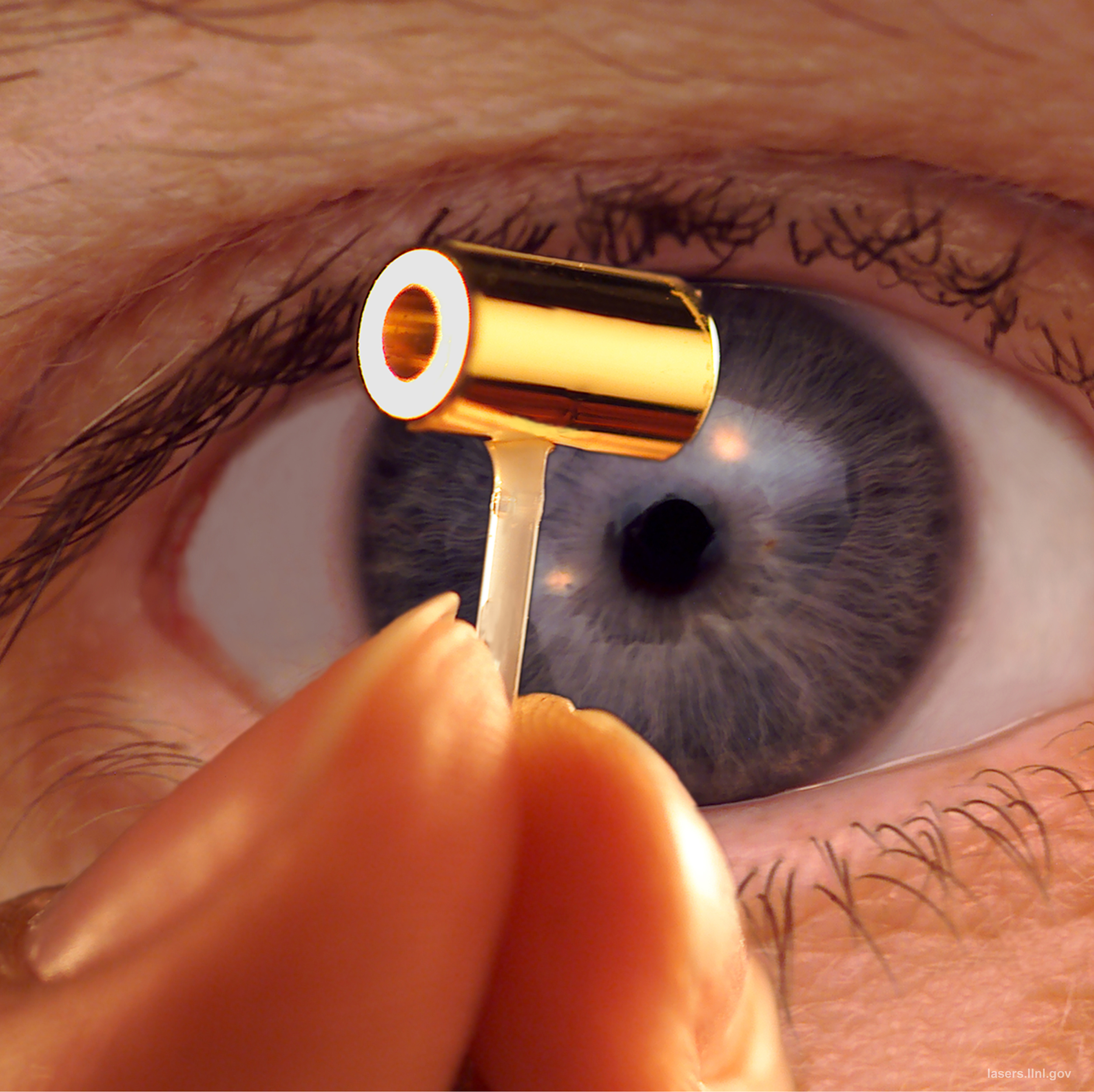
Mockup of the gold-plated hohlraum designed for the NIF

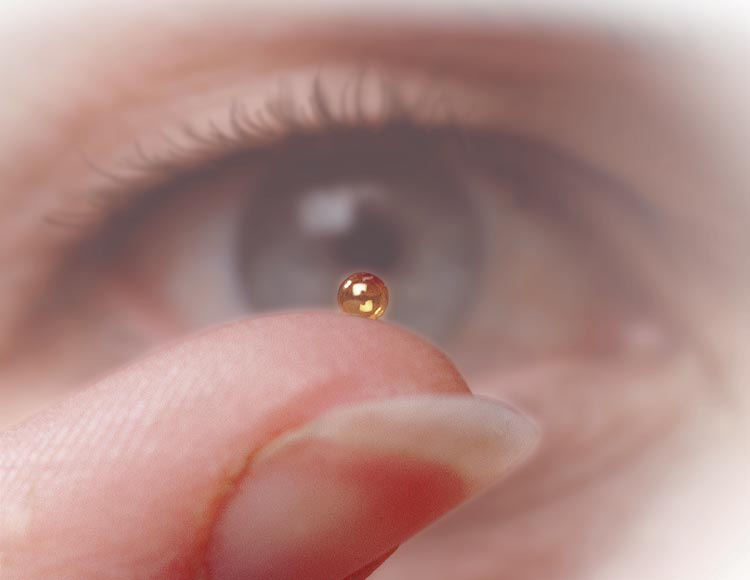
NIF's fuel "target", filled with either D–T gas or D–T ice. The capsule is held in the hohlraum using thin plastic webbing.

=== Other concepts ===
NIF is also exploring new types of targets. Previous experiments generally used plastic ablators, typically polystyrene (CH). NIF targets are constructed by coating a plastic form with a layer of sputtered beryllium or beryllium–copper alloy, and then oxidizing the plastic out of the center. Beryllium targets offer higher implosion efficiencies from x-ray inputs.

Although NIF was primarily designed as an indirect drive device, the energy in the laser as of 2008 was high enough to be used as a direct drive system, where the laser shines directly on the target without conversion to x-rays. The power delivered by NIF UV rays was estimated to be more than enough to cause ignition, allowing fusion energy gains of about 40x, somewhat higher than the indirect drive system.

As of 2005, scaled implosions on the OMEGA laser and computer simulations showed NIF to be capable of ignition using a polar direct drive (PDD) configuration where the target was irradiated directly by the laser only from the top and bottom, without changes to the NIF beamline layout.

As of 2005, other targets, called saturn targets, were specifically designed to reduce the anisotropy and improve the implosion. They feature a small plastic ring around the "equator" of the target, which becomes a plasma when hit by the laser. Some of the laser light is refracted through this plasma back towards the equator of the target, evening out the heating. NIF ignition with gains of just over 35 times are thought to be possible, producing results almost as good as the fully symmetric direct drive approach.

== History ==
=== Impetus, 1957 ===
The history of ICF at Lawrence Livermore National Laboratory in Livermore, California, started with physicist John Nuckolls, who started considering the problem after a 1957 meeting arranged by Edward Teller there. During these meetings, the idea later known as PACER emerged. PACER envisioned the explosion of small hydrogen bombs in large caverns to generate steam that would be converted into electrical power. After identifying problems with this approach, Nuckolls wondered how small a bomb could be made that would still generate net positive power.

A typical hydrogen bomb has two parts: a plutonium-based fission bomb known as the primary, and a cylindrical arrangement of fusion fuels known as the secondary. The primary releases x-rays, which are trapped within the bomb casing. They heat and compress the secondary until it ignites. The secondary consists of lithium deuteride (LiD) fuel, which requires an external neutron source. This is normally in the form of a small plutonium "spark plug" in the center of the fuel. Nuckolls's idea was to explore how small the secondary could be made, and what effects this would have on the energy needed from the primary to cause ignition. The simplest change is to replace the LiD fuel with DT gas, removing the need for the spark plug. This allows secondaries of any size – as the secondary shrinks, so does the amount of energy needed for ignition. At the milligram level, the energy levels started to approach those available through several known devices.

By the early 1960s, Nuckolls and several other weapons designers had developed ICF's outlines. The DT fuel would be placed in a small capsule, designed to rapidly ablate when heated and thereby maximize compression and shock wave formation. This capsule would be placed within an engineered shell, the hohlraum, which acts like the bomb casing. The hohlraum did not have to be heated by x-rays; any source of energy could be used as long as it delivered enough energy to heat the hohlraum and produce x-rays. Ideally the energy source would be located some distance away, to mechanically isolate both ends of the reaction. A small atomic bomb could be used as the energy source, as in a hydrogen bomb, but ideally smaller energy sources would be used. Using computer simulations, the teams estimated that about 5 MJ of energy would be needed from the primary, generating a 1 MJ beam. To put this in perspective, a small (0.5 kt ) fission primary releases 2 TJ.

=== ICF program, 1970s ===
While Nuckolls and LLNL were working on hohlraum-based concepts, UCSD physicist Keith Brueckner was independently working on direct drive. In the early 1970s, Brueckner formed KMS Fusion to commercialize this concept. This sparked an intense rivalry between KMS and the weapons labs. Formerly ignored, ICF became a hot topic and most of the labs started ICF work. LLNL decided to concentrate on glass lasers, while other facilities studied gas lasers using carbon dioxide (e.g. ANTARES, Los Alamos National Laboratory) or KrF (e.g. Nike laser, Naval Research Laboratory).

Throughout these early stages, much of the understanding of the fusion process was the result of computer simulations, primarily LASNEX. LASNEX simplified the reaction to a 2-dimensional approximation, which was all that was possible with the available computing power. LASNEX estimated that laser drivers in the kJ range could reach low gain, which was just within the state of the art. This led to the Shiva laser project which was completed in 1977. Shiva fell far short of its goals. The densities reached were thousands of times smaller than predicted. This was traced to issues with the way the laser delivered heat to the target. Most of its energy energized electrons rather than the entire fuel mass. Further experiments and simulations demonstrated that this process could be dramatically improved by using shorter wavelengths.

Further upgrades to the simulation programs, accounting for these effects, predicted that a different design would reach ignition. This system took the form of the 20-beam 200 kJ Nova laser. During the construction phase, Nuckolls found an error in his calculations, and an October 1979 review chaired by former LLNL director John S. Foster Jr. confirmed that Nova would not reach ignition. It was modified into a smaller 10-beam design that converted the light to 351 nm and increase coupling efficiency. Nova was able to deliver about 30 kJ of UV laser energy, about half of what was expected, primarily due to optical damage to the final focusing optics. Even at those levels, it was clear that the predictions for fusion production were wrong; even at the limited powers available, fusion yields were far below predictions.

=== Halite and Centurion, 1978 ===
Each experiment showed that the energy needed to reach ignition continued to be underestimated. The Department of Energy (DOE) decided that direct experimentation was the best way to settle the issue, and in 1978 they started a series of underground experiments at the Nevada Test Site that used small nuclear bombs to illuminate ICF targets. The tests were known as Halite (LLNL) and Centurion (LANL).

The basic concept behind the tests had been developed in the 1960s as a way to develop anti-ballistic missile warheads. It was found that bombs that exploded outside the atmosphere gave off bursts of X-rays that could damage an enemy warhead at long range. To test the effectiveness of this system, and to develop countermeasures to protect US warheads, the Defense Atomic Support Agency (now the Defense Threat Reduction Agency) developed a system that placed the targets at the end of long tunnels behind fast-shutting doors. The doors were timed to shut in the brief period between the arrival of the X-rays and the subsequent blast. This saved the reentry vehicle (RV) from blast damage and allowed them to be inspected.

ICF tests used the same system, replacing the RVs by hohlraums. Each test simultaneously illuminated many targets, each at a different distance from the bomb to test the effect of varying of illumination. Another question was how large the fuel assembly had to be in order for the fuel to self-heat from the fusion reactions and thus reach ignition. Initial data were available by mid-1984, and the testing ceased in 1988. Ignition was achieved for the first time during these tests. The amount of energy and the size of the fuel targets needed to reach ignition was far higher than predicted. During this same period, experiments began on Nova using similar targets to understand their behavior under laser illumination, allowing direct comparison against the bomb tests.

This data suggested that about 10 MJ of X-ray energy would be needed to reach ignition, far beyond what had earlier been calculated. If those X-rays are created by beaming an IR laser to a hohlraum, as in Nova or NIF, then dramatically more laser energy would be required, on the order of 100 MJ.

This triggered a debate in the ICF community. One group suggested an attempt to build a laser of this power; Leonardo Mascheroni and Claude Phipps designed a new type of hydrogen fluoride laser pumped by high-energy electrons and reach the 100 MJ threshold. Others used the same data and new versions of their computer simulations to suggest that careful shaping of the laser pulse and more beams spread more evenly could achieve ignition with a laser powered between 5 and 10 MJ.

These results prompted the DOE to request a custom military ICF facility named the "Laboratory Microfusion Facility" (LMF). LMF would use a driver on the order of 10 MJ, delivering fusion yields of between 100 and 1,000 MJ. A 1989–1990 review of this concept by the National Academy of Sciences suggested that LMF was too ambitious, and that fundamental physics needed to be further explored. They recommended further experiments before attempting to move to a 10 MJ system. Nevertheless, the authors noted, "Indeed, if it did turn out that a 100 MJ driver were required for ignition and gain, one would have to rethink the entire approach to, and rationale for, ICF".

=== Laboratory Microfusion Facility and Nova Upgrade, 1990 ===
As of 1992, the Laboratory Microfusion Facility was estimated to cost about $1 billion. LLNL initially submitted a design with a 5 MJ 350 nm (UV) driver that would be able to reach about 200 MJ yield, which was enough to attain the majority of the LMF goals.That program was estimated to cost about $600 million FY 1989 dollars. An additional $250 million would pay to upgrade it to a full 1,000 MJ. The total would surpass $1 billion to meet all of the goals requested by the DOE.

The NAS review led to a reevaluation of these plans, and in July 1990, LLNL responded with the Nova Upgrade, which would reuse most of Nova, along with the adjacent Shiva facility. The resulting system would be much lower power than the LMF concept, with a driver of about 1 MJ. The new design included features that advanced the state of the art in the driver section, including multi-pass in the main amplifiers, and 18 beamlines (up from 10) that were split into 288 "beamlets" as they entered the target area. The plans called for the installation of two main banks of beamlines, one in the existing Nova beamline room, and the other in the older Shiva building next door, extending through its laser bay and target area into an upgraded Nova target area. The lasers would deliver about 500 TW in a 4 ns pulse. The upgrades were expected to produce fusion yields of between 2 and 10 MJ. The initial estimates from 1992 estimated construction costs around $400 million, with construction taking place from 1995 to 1999.

=== NIF, 1994 ===
Throughout this period, the ending of the Cold War led to dramatic changes in defense funding and priorities. The political support for nuclear weapons declined and arms agreements led to a reduction in warhead count and less design work. The US was faced with the prospect of losing a generation of nuclear weapon designers able to maintain existing stockpiles, or design new weapons. At the same time, the Comprehensive Nuclear-Test-Ban Treaty (CTBT) was signed in 1996, which would ban all criticality testing and made the development of newer generations of nuclear weapons more difficult.

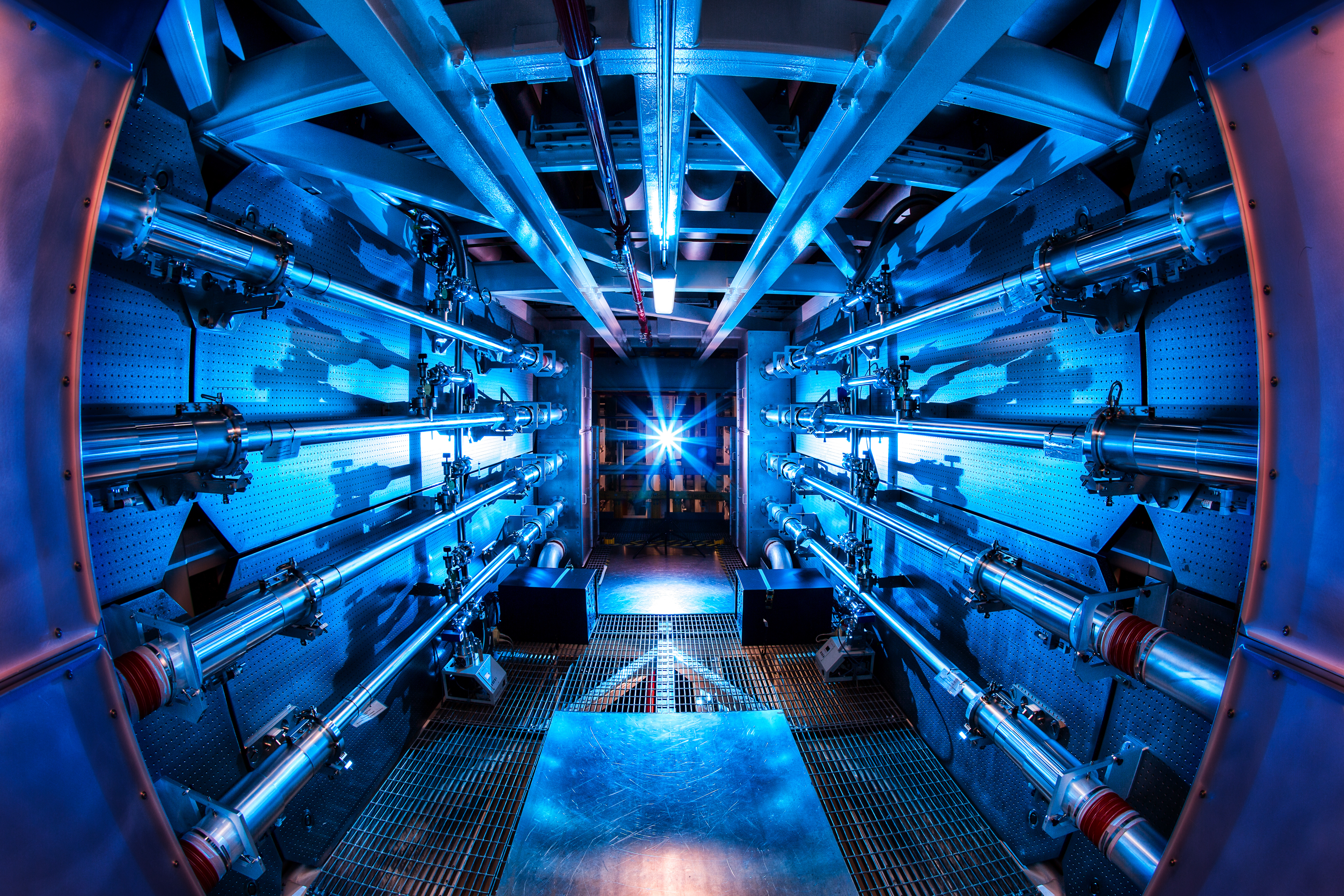
The preamplifiers of the National Ignition Facility are the first step in increasing the energy of laser beams as they make their way toward the target chamber. In 2012 NIF achieved a 500 terawatt shot—1,000 times more power than the United States uses at any instant in time.

Out of these changes came the Stockpile Stewardship and Management Program (SSMP), which, among other things, included funds for the development of methods to design and build nuclear weapons without having to test them explosively. In a series of meetings that started in 1995, an agreement formed between the labs to divide up SSMP efforts. An important part of this would be confirmation of computer models using low-yield ICF experiments. The Nova Upgrade was too small to use for these experiments. (Note: It is not clearly stated why Nova Upgrade would be too small for SSMP, no reason is given in the available resources.) A redesign matured into NIF in 1994. The estimated cost of the project remained almost $1 billion, with completion in 2002.

In spite of the agreement, the large project cost combined with the ending of similar projects at other labs resulted in critical comments by scientists at other labs, Sandia National Laboratories in particular. In May 1997, Sandia fusion scientist Rick Spielman publicly stated that NIF had "virtually no internal peer review on the technical issues" and that "Livermore essentially picked the panel to review themselves". A retired Sandia manager, Bob Puerifoy, was even more blunt than Spielman: "NIF is worthless ... it can't be used to maintain the stockpile, period". Ray Kidder, one of the original developers of the ICF concept at LLNL, was also highly critical. He stated in 1997 that its primary purpose was to "recruit and maintain a staff of theorists and experimentalists" and that while some of the experimental data would prove useful for weapons design, differences in the experimental setup limit their relevance. "Some of the physics is the same; but the details, 'wherein the devil lies,' are quite different. It would therefore also be wrong to assume that NIF will be able to support for the long term a staff of weapons designers and engineers with detailed design competence comparable to that of those now working at the weapons design laboratories."

In 1997, Victor Reis, assistant secretary for Defense Programs within DOE and SSMP chief architect defended the program telling the U.S. House Armed Services Committee that NIF was "designed to produce, for the first time in a laboratory setting, conditions of temperature and density of matter close to those that occur in the detonation of nuclear weapons. The ability to study the behavior of matter and the transfer of energy and radiation under these conditions is key to understanding the basic physics of nuclear weapons and predicting their performance without underground nuclear testing." In 1998, two JASON panels, composed of scientific and technical experts, stated that NIF is the most scientifically valuable of all programs proposed for science-based stockpile stewardship.

Despite the initial criticism, Sandia, as well as Los Alamos, supported the development of many NIF technologies, and both laboratories later became partners with NIF in the National Ignition Campaign.

=== Construction of first unit, 1994–1998 ===
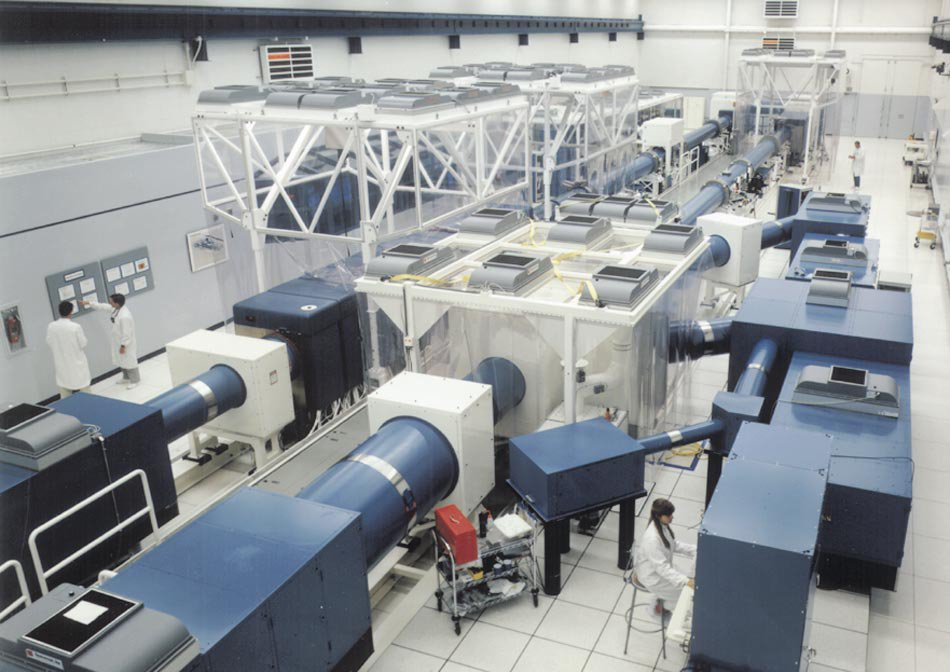
The Beamlet laser tested the design and techniques that would be used on NIF.

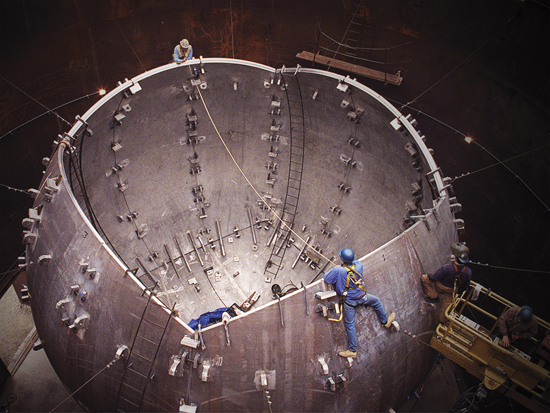
The NIF target chamber was so large it had to be built in sections.

Work on the NIF started with a single beamline demonstrator, Beamlet. Beamlet successfully operated between 1994 and 1997. It was then sent to Sandia National Laboratories as a light source in their Z machine. A full-sized demonstrator then followed, in AMPLAB, which started operations in 1997. The official groundbreaking on the main NIF site was on May 29, 1997.

At the time, the DOE was estimating that the NIF would cost approximately $1.1 billion and another $1 billion for related research, and would be complete as early as 2002. Later in 1997 the DOE approved an additional $100 million in funding and pushed the operational date back to 2004. As late as 1998 LLNL's public documents stated the overall price was $1.2 billion, with the first eight lasers coming online in 2001 and full completion in 2003.

The facility's physical scale alone made the construction project challenging. By the time the "conventional facility" (the shell for the laser) was complete in 2001, more than 210,000 cubic yards of soil had been excavated, more than 73,000 cubic yards of concrete had been poured, 7,600 tons of reinforcing steel rebar had been placed, and more than 5,000 tons of structural steel had been erected. To isolate the laser system from vibration, the foundation of each laser bay was made independent of the rest of the structure. Three-foot-thick, 420-foot-long and 80-foot-wide slabs required continuous concrete pours to achieve their specifications.

In November 1997, an El Niño storm dumped two inches of rain in two hours, flooding the NIF site with 200,000 gallons of water just three days before the scheduled foundation pour. The earth was so soaked that the framing for the retaining wall sank six inches, forcing the crew to disassemble and reassemble it. Construction was halted in December 1997, when 16,000-year-old mammoth bones were discovered. Paleontologists were called in to remove and preserve the bones, delaying construction by four days.

A variety of research and development, technology and engineering challenges arose, such as creating an optics fabrication capability to supply the laser glass for NIF's 7,500 meter-sized optics. State-of-the-art optics measurement, coating and finishing techniques were developed to withstand NIF's high-energy lasers, as were methods for amplifying the laser beams to the needed energy levels. Continuous-pour glass, rapid-growth crystals, innovative optical switches, and deformable mirrors were among NIF's technology innovations developed.

Sandia, with extensive experience in pulsed power delivery, designed the capacitor banks used to feed the flashlamps, completing the first unit in October 1998. To everyone's surprise, the Pulsed Power Conditioning Modules (PCMs) suffered capacitor failures that led to explosions. This required a redesign of the module to contain the debris, but since the concrete had already been poured, this left the new modules so tightly packed that in-place maintenance was impossible. Another redesign followed, this time allowing the modules to be removed from the bays for servicing. Continuing problems further delayed operations, and in September 1999, an updated DOE report stated that NIF required up to $350 million more and completion occur only in 2006.

=== Re-baseline and GAO report, 1999–2000 ===
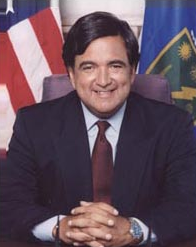
Bill Richardson began a review process that brought NIF construction back under control.

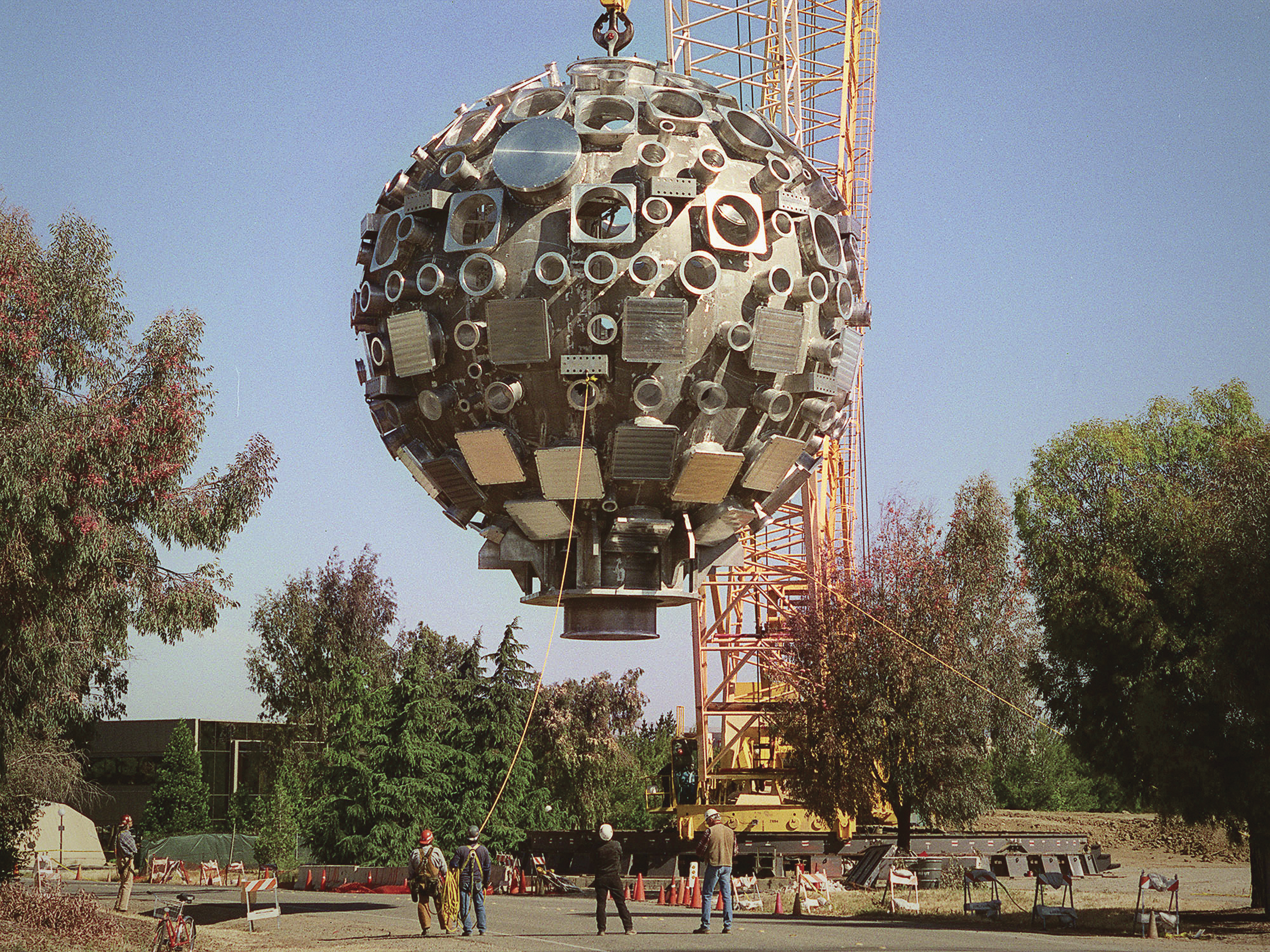
Crane moves the National Ignition Facility's target chamber, 1999

Throughout this period the problems with NIF were not reported up the management chain. In 1999 then Secretary of Energy Bill Richardson reported to Congress that NIF was on time and budget, as project leaders had reported. In August that year it was revealed that neither claim was close to the truth. As the Government Accountability Office (GAO) would later note, "Furthermore, the Laboratory's former laser director, who oversaw NIF and all other laser activities, assured Laboratory managers, DOE, the university, and the Congress that the NIF project was adequately funded and staffed and was continuing on cost and schedule, even while he was briefed on clear and growing evidence that NIF had serious problems". A DOE Task Force reported to Richardson in January 2000 that "organizations of the NIF project failed to implement program and project management procedures and processes commensurate with a major research and development project... [and that] ...no one gets a passing grade on NIF Management: not the DOE's office of Defense Programs, not the Lawrence Livermore National Laboratory and not the University of California".

Given the budget problems, the US Congress requested an independent GAO review. They returned a critical report in August 2000 estimating that the cost was likely to be $3.9 billion, including R&D, and that the facility was unlikely to be completed anywhere near on time. The report noted management problems for the overruns, and criticized the program for failing to budget money for target fabrication, including it in operational costs instead of development.

In 2000, the DOE began a comprehensive "rebaseline review" because of the technical delays and project management issues, and adjusted the schedule and budget accordingly. John Gordon, National Nuclear Security Administrator, stated "We have prepared a detailed bottom-up cost and schedule to complete the NIF project... The independent review supports our position that the NIF management team has made significant progress and resolved earlier problems". The report revised their budget estimate to $2.25 billion, not including related R&D which pushed it to $3.3 billion total, and pushed back the completion date to 2006 with the first lines coming online in 2004. A follow-up report the next year pushed the budget to $4.2 billion, and the completion date to 2008.

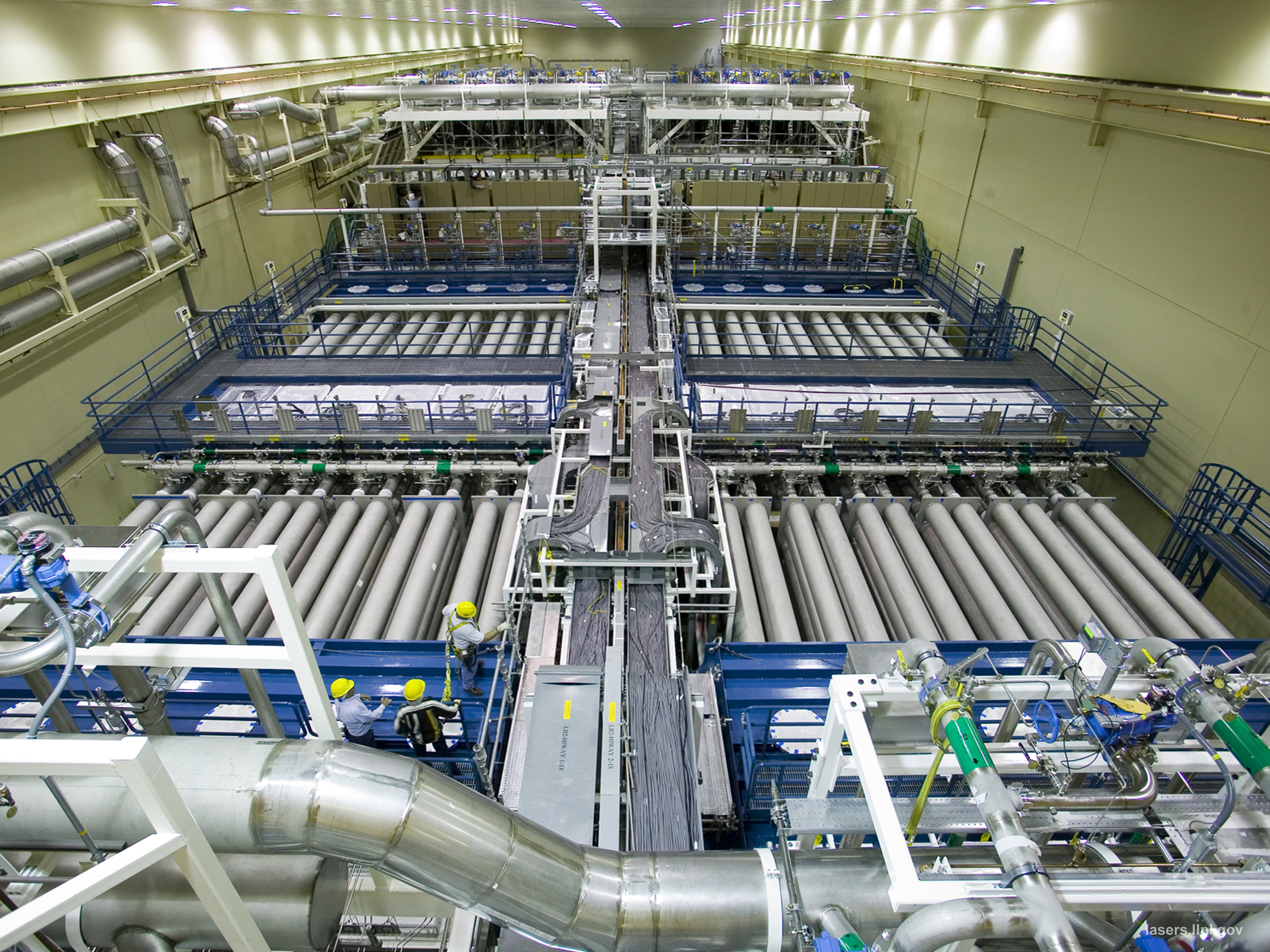
Laser Bay 2 was commissioned in July 2007.

The project got a new management team in September 1999, headed by George Miller, who was named acting associate director for lasers. Ed Moses, former head of the Atomic Vapor Laser Isotope Separation (AVLIS) program at LLNL, became NIF project manager. Thereafter, NIF management received many positive reviews and the project met the budgets and schedules approved by Congress. In October 2010, the project was named "Project of the Year" by the Project Management Institute, which cited NIF as a "stellar example of how properly applied project management excellence can bring together global teams to deliver a project of this scale and importance efficiently."

=== Tests and construction completion, 2003–2009 ===
In May 2003, the NIF achieved "first light" on a bundle of four beams, producing a 10.4 kJ IR pulse in a single beamline. In 2005 the first eight beams produced 153 kJ of IR, eclipsing OMEGA as the planet's highest energy laser (per pulse). By January 2007 all of the LRUs in the Master Oscillator Room (MOOR) were complete and the computer room had been installed. By August 2007, 96 laser lines were completed and commissioned, and "A total infrared energy of more than 2.5 megajoules has now been fired. This is more than 40 times what the Nova laser typically operated at the time it was the world's largest laser".

In 2005, an independent review by the JASON Defense Advisory Group that was generally positive, concluded that "The scientific and technical challenges in such a complex activity suggest that success in the early attempts at ignition in 2010, while possible, is unlikely". On January 26, 2009, the final line replaceable unit (LRU) was installed, unofficially completing construction. On February 26, 2009, NIF fired all 192 laser beams into the target chamber. On March 10, 2009, NIF became the first laser to break the megajoule barrier, delivering 1.1 MJ of UV light, known as 3ω (from third-harmonic generation), to the target chamber center in a shaped ignition pulse. The main laser delivered 1.952 MJ of IR.

=== Operations, 2009–2012 ===
On May 29, 2009, the NIF was dedicated in a ceremony attended by thousands. The first laser shots into a hohlraum target were fired in late June.

==== Buildup to main experiments, 2010 ====
On January 28, 2010, NIF reported the delivery of a 669 kJ pulse to a gold hohlraum, breaking records for laser power delivery, and analysis suggested that suspected interference by generated plasma would not be a problem in igniting a fusion reaction. Due to the size of the test hohlraums, laser/plasma interactions produced plasma-optics gratings, acting like tiny prisms, which produced symmetric X-ray drive on the capsule inside the hohlraum.

After gradually altering the wavelength of the laser, scientists compressed a spherical capsule evenly and heated it to 3.3 million kelvins (285 eV). The capsule contained cryogenically cooled gas, acting as a substitute for the deuterium and tritium fuel capsules to be used later. Plasma Physics Group Leader Siegfried Glenzer said that they could maintain the precise fuel layers needed in the lab, but not yet within the laser system.

As of January 2010, the NIF reached 1.8 megajoules. The target chamber then needed to be equipped with shields to block neutrons.

==== National Ignition Campaign 2010–2012 ====
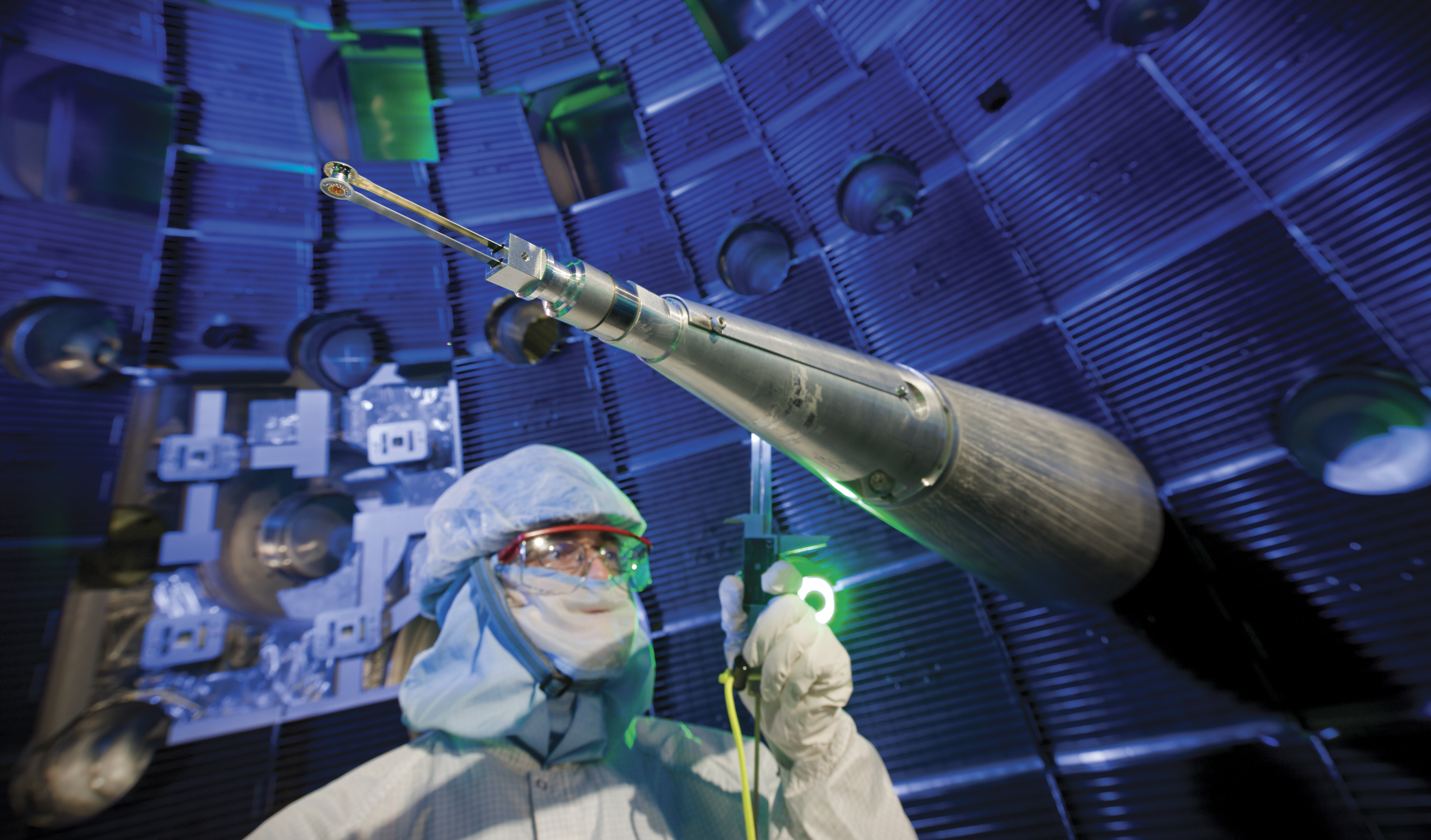
Technician works on target positioner inside National Ignition Facility (NIF) target chamber.

With the main construction complete, NIF started its National Ignition Campaign (NIC) to reach ignition. At the time, articles appeared in science magazines stating that ignition was imminent. Scientific American opened a 2010 review article with the statement "Ignition is close now. Within a year or two..."

The first test was carried out on October 8, 2010, at slightly over 1 MJ. However, problems slowed the drive toward ignition-level laser energies in the 1.4–1.5 MJ range.

One problem was the potential for damage from overheating due to a greater concentration of energy on optical components. Other issues included problems layering the fuel inside the target, and minute quantities of dust on the capsule surface.

The power level continued to increase and targets became more sophisticated. Then minute amounts of water vapor appeared in the target chamber and froze to the windows on the ends of the hohlraums, causing an asymmetric implosion. This was solved by adding a second layer of glass on either end, in effect creating a storm window.

Shots halted from February to April 2011, to conduct SSMP materials experiments. Then, NIF was upgraded, improving diagnostic and measurement instruments. The Advanced Radiographic Capability (ARC) system was added, which uses 4 of the NIF's 192 beams as a backlight for imaging the implosion sequence. ARC is essentially a petawatt-class laser with peak power exceeding a quadrillion (10^{15}) watts. It is designed to produce brighter, more penetrating, higher-energy x rays. ARC became the world's highest-energy short-pulse laser, capable of creating picosecond-duration laser pulses to produce energetic x rays in the range of 50–100 keV.

NIC runs restarted in May 2011 with the goal of more precisely timing the four laser shock waves that compress the fusion target.

In January 2012, Mike Dunne, director of NIF's laser fusion energy program, predicted that ignition would be achieved at NIF by October. In the same month, the NIF fired a record high 57 shots. On March 15 NIF produced a laser pulse with 411 TW of peak power. On July 5, it produced a shorter pulse of 1.85 MJ and increased power of 500 TW.

=== DOE Report, July 19, 2012 ===
NIC was periodically reviewed. The 6th review, was published on July 19, 2012. The report praised the quality of the installation: lasers, optics, targets, diagnostics, and operations. However:

The integrated conclusion based on this extensive period of experimentation, however, is that considerable hurdles must be overcome to reach ignition or the goal of observing unequivocal alpha heating. Indeed the reviewers note that given the unknowns with the present 'semi-empirical' approach, the probability of ignition before the end of December is extremely low and even the goal of demonstrating unambiguous alpha heating is challenging.

Further, the report expressed deep concerns that the gaps between observed performance and simulation codes implied that the current codes were of limited utility. Specifically, they found a lack of predictive ability of the radiation drive to the capsule and inadequately modeled laser–plasma interactions. Pressure was reaching only one half to one third of that required for ignition, far below the predicted values. The memo discussed the mixing of ablator material and capsule fuel likely due to hydrodynamics instabilities in the ablator's outer surface.

The report suggested using a thicker ablator, although this would increase its inertia. To keep the required implosion speed, they proposed that the NIF energy be increased to 2MJ. It questioned whether or not the energy was sufficient to compress a large enough capsule to avoid the mix limit and reach ignition. The report concluded that ignition within the calendar year 2012 was 'highly unlikely'.

NIC officially ended on September 30, 2012. Media reports suggested that NIF would shift its focus toward materials research.

In 2008, LLNL began the Laser Inertial Fusion Energy program (LIFE), to explore ways to use NIF technologies as the basis for a commercial power plant design. The focus was on pure fusion devices, incorporating technologies that developed in parallel with NIF that would greatly improve the performance of the design. In April 2014, LIFE ended.

=== Fuel gain breakeven, 2013 ===
A NIF fusion shot on September 27, 2013, produced more energy than was absorbed by the deuterium–tritium fuel. This has been confused with having reached "scientific breakeven", defined as the fusion energy exceeding the laser input energy. Using this definition gives 14.4 kJ out and 1.8 MJ in, a ratio of 0.008.

=== Plutonium experiments, 2013–2015 ===
In 2013, NIF shifted focus to materials and weapons research. Experiments beginning in FY 2015 used plutonium-242 targets. Plutonium use ranged from less than a milligram to 10 milligrams. This isotope is not fissile by stray spontaneous fission neutrons, but is photofissionable by gamma rays around 5 MeV. Under certain configurations the NIF can generate 10 MeV photons.

In theory, the Comprehensive Nuclear-Test-Ban Treaty allows for chemical high explosive implosion testing of plutonium-242 to study fission weapons. NIF experiments more likely simulate the compression of the plutonium sparkplug in the second stage of a thermonuclear weapon.

In FY 2014, NIF performed 191 shots, slightly more than one every two days. As of April 2015 NIF was on track to meet its goal of 300 laser shots in FY 2015.

=== Back to fusion, 2016–2018 ===
On January 28, 2016, NIF successfully executed its first gas pipe experiment intended to study the absorption of large amounts of laser light within 1 centimetre (0.39 in) long targets relevant to high-gain magnetized liner inertial fusion (MagLIF). In order to investigate key aspects of the propagation, stability, and efficiency of laser energy coupling at full scale for high-gain MagLIF target designs, a single quad of NIF was used to deliver 30 kJ of energy to a target during a 13 nanosecond shaped pulse. Data return was favorable.

In 2018, improvements in controlling compression asymmetry was demonstrated in a shot with an output of 1.9×10^{16} neutrons, resulting in 0.054 MJ of fusion energy released by a 1.5 MJ laser pulse.

=== Back to plutonium, 2019 ===
From April to October 2019, ramp-compression tests were carried out on plutonium-242. These used x-ray crystallography to study crystal phases of plutonium, and determine its equation of state.

=== Burning plasma achieved, 2021 ===
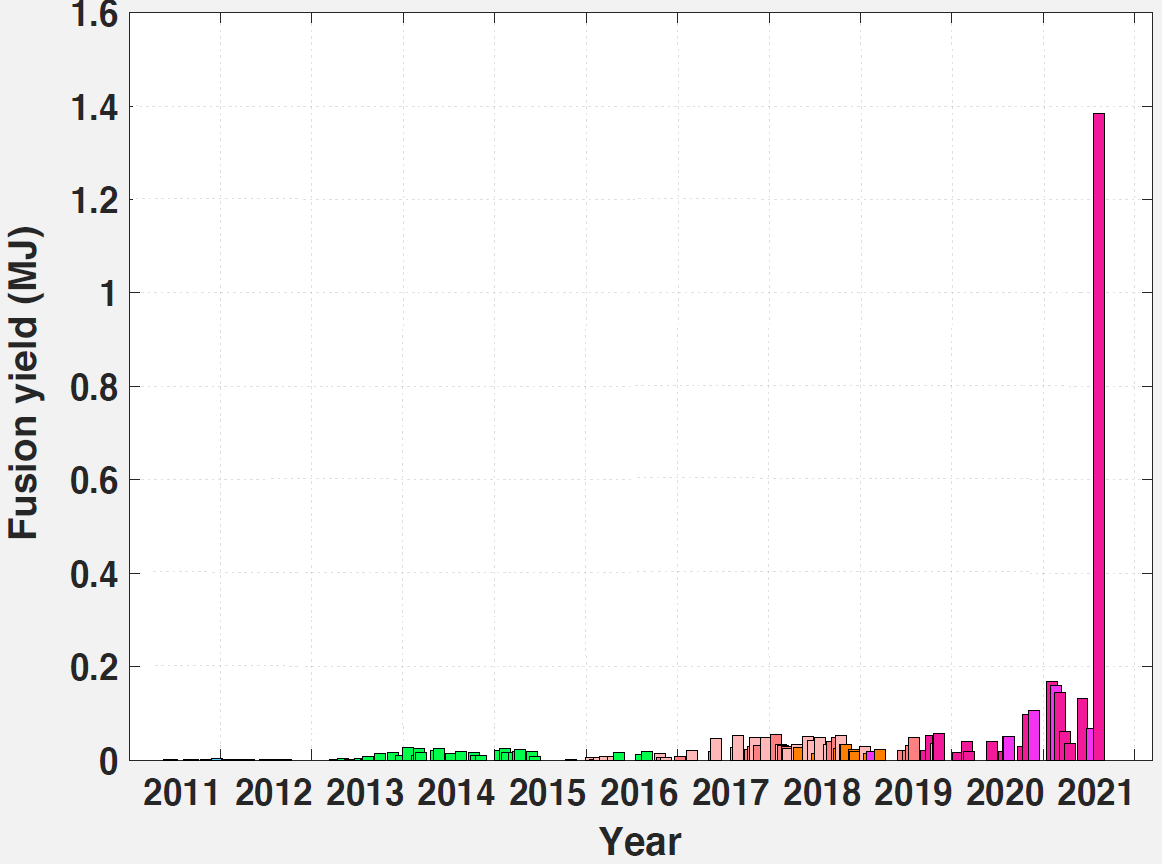
Plot of NIF results from 2011 to 2021 shows the dramatic increase in fusion energy due to a burning plasma.

Experiments in 2020 and 2021 yielded the world's first burning plasmas in the laboratory, in which most of the plasma heating came from nuclear fusion reactions. This result was followed on August 8, 2021 by the world's first ignited plasma, in which the fusion heating was sufficient to sustain the thermonuclear reaction. It produced excess neutrons consistent with a short-lived chain reaction of around 100 trillionths of a second (i.e., 100 picoseconds or 0.1 nanoseconds).

The fusion energy yield of the 2021 experiment was estimated to be 70% of the laser energy incident on the plasma. This result slightly beat the former record of 67% set by the JET torus in 1997. Taking the energy efficiency of the laser itself into account, the experiment used about 477 MJ of electrical energy to get 1.8 MJ of energy into the target to create 1.3 MJ of fusion energy.

Several design changes enabled this result. The material of the capsule shell was changed to diamond to increase the absorbance of secondary x-rays created by the laser burst, thus increasing the efficacy of the collapse, and its surface was further smoothed. The size of the hole in the capsule used to inject fuel was reduced. The holes in the gold cylinder surrounding the capsule were shrunk to reduce energy loss. The laser pulse was extended.

=== Scientific breakeven achieved, 2022, and further achievements ===
A December 13, 2022 video announcement of the first controlled fusion experiment in history to achieve fusion ignition, via the YouTube page of the Lawrence Livermore National Laboratory

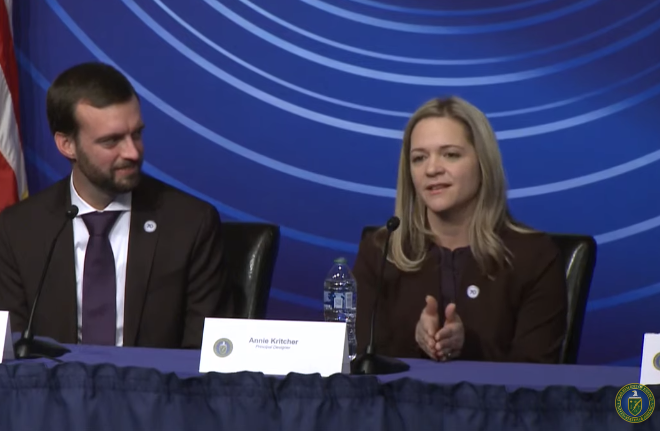
Principal designer Annie Kritcher speaks at the December 13, 2022 press conference announcing breakeven ignition.

The NIF became the first fusion experiment to achieve scientific breakeven on December 5, 2022, with an experiment producing 3.15 megajoules of energy from a 2.05 megajoule input of laser light for an energy gain of about 1.5. In a public announcement on December 13, the Secretary of Energy Jennifer Granholm announced the facility had achieved ignition. While this was often characterized as a "net energy gain" from fusion, this was only true with respect to the energy delivered by the laser; reports sometimes omitted the ~400 MJ power input required to power the facility.

The feat required the use of a slightly thicker and smoother capsule surrounding the fuel and a 2.05 MJ laser (up from 1.9 MJ in 2021), yielding 3.15 MJ, a 54% surplus. They also redistributed the energy among the split laser beams, which produced a more symmetrical (spherical) implosion.

The NIF achieved breakeven for a second time on July 30, 2023 yielding 3.88 MJ, an 89% surplus. At least four of six shots performed after the first successful one in December 2022 achieved breakeven. These successes led the DOE to fund three additional research centers. An experiment in February 2024 yielded 5.2 MJ from 2.2 MJ of input, a 136% surplus. In 2025, tests reached 8.6 MJ.

== Similar projects ==
Some similar experimental ICF projects are:

- Laser Mégajoule (LMJ)
- Nike laser
- High Power laser Energy Research facility (HiPER)
- Laboratory for Laser Energetics (LLE)
- Magnetized liner inertial fusion (MagLIF)
- Shenguang-II High Power Laser

== Pictures ==
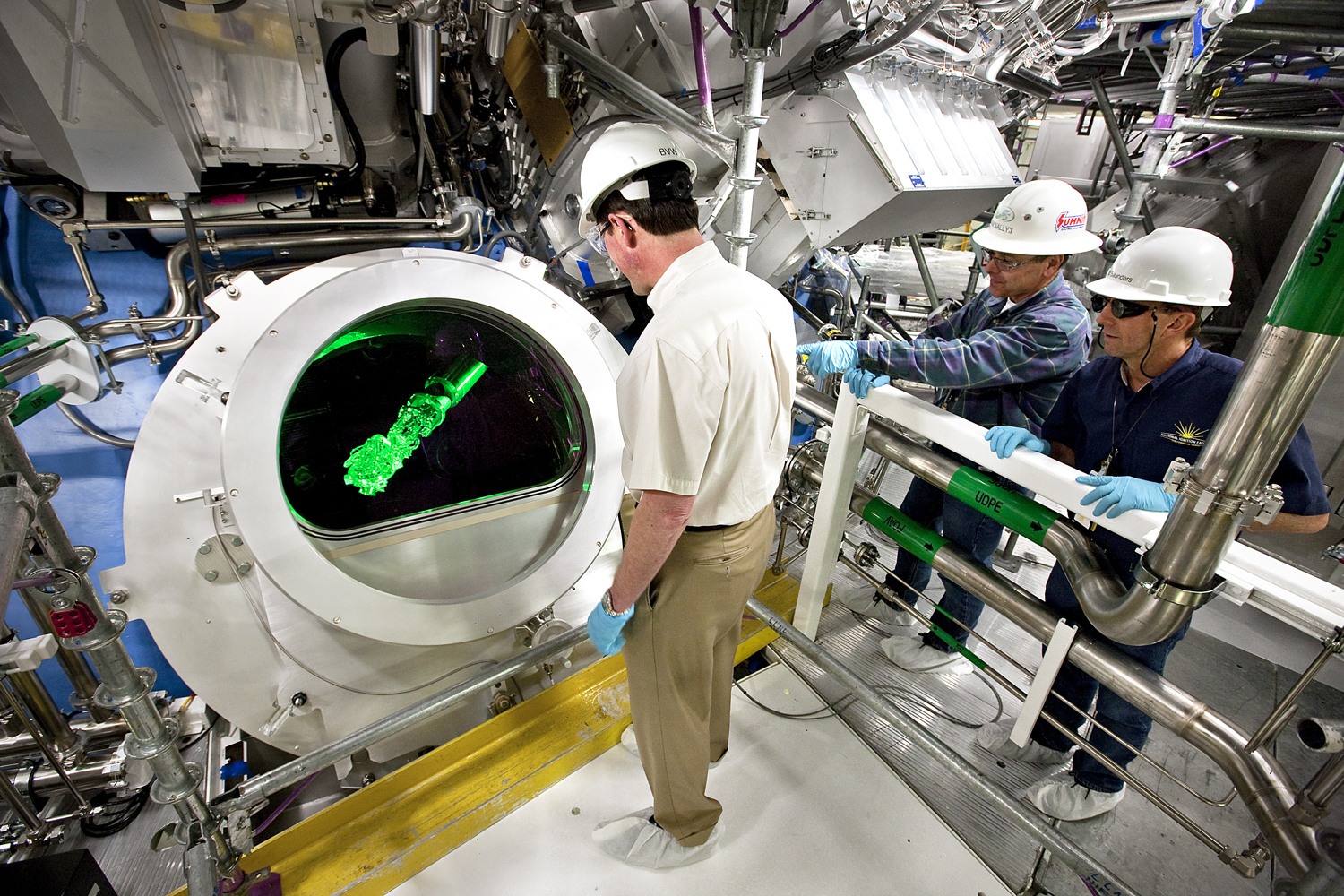
Viewing port allows a look into the interior of the 30 foot diameter target chamber.

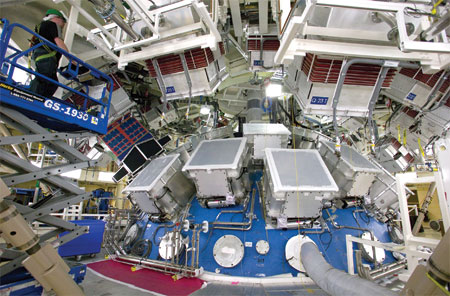
Exterior view of the upper third of the target chamber. The large square beam ports are prominent.

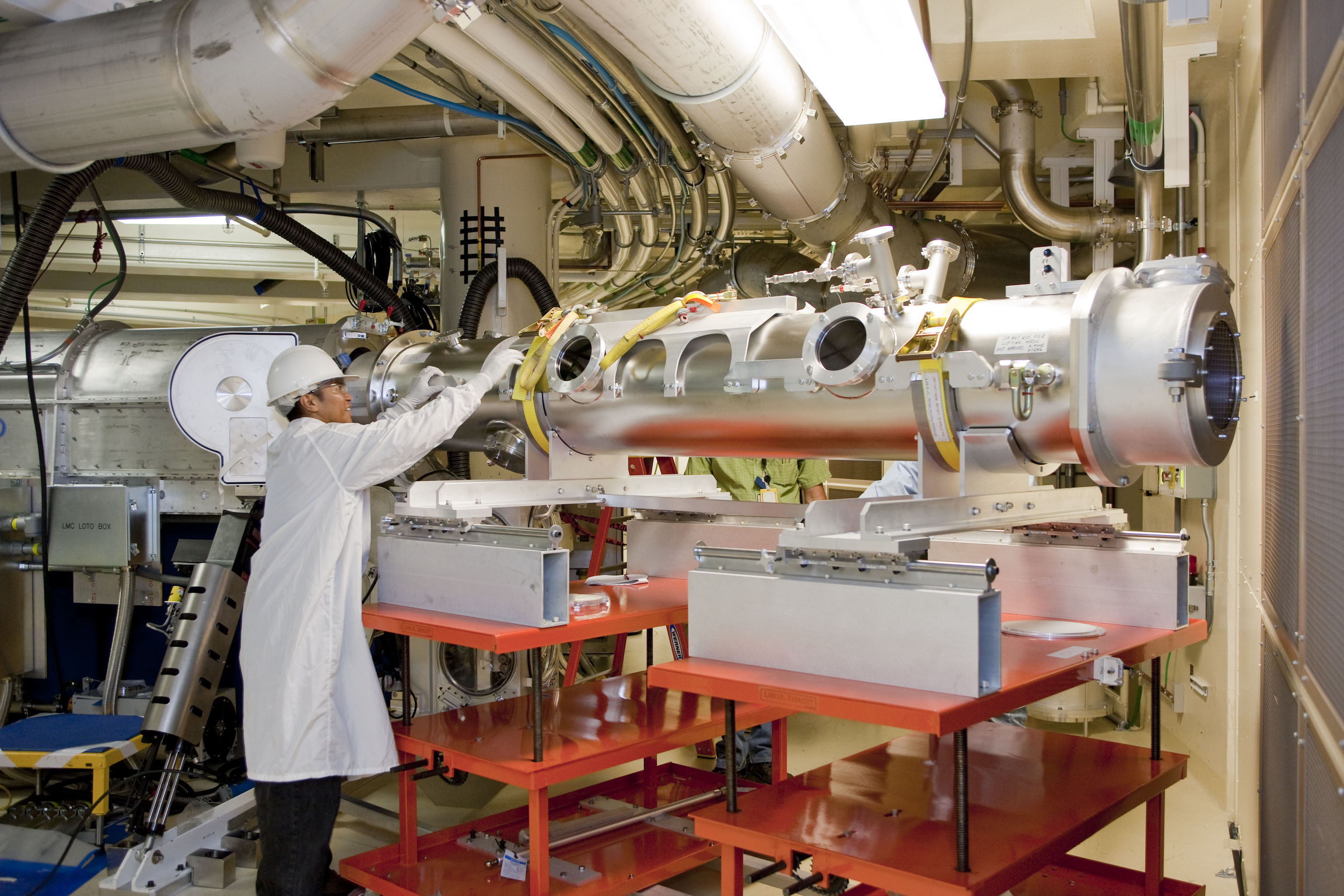
A technician loads an instrument canister into the vacuum-sealed diagnostic instrument manipulator.

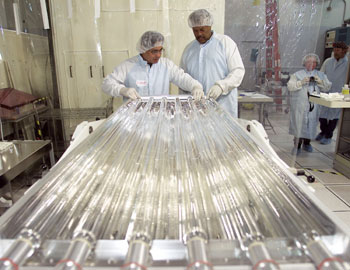
The flashlamps used to pump the main amplifiers are the largest ever in commercial production.

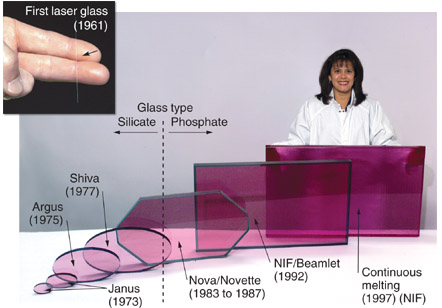
The glass slabs used in the amplifiers are likewise much larger than those used in previous lasers.

== In popular culture ==
The NIF was used as the set for the starship Enterprise's warp core in the 2013 movie Star Trek Into Darkness.

== See also ==
- Z Pulsed Power Facility
- Chain reaction
- HiPER
- Inertial confinement fusion
- ITER
- Laser Mégajoule
- Nuclear fusion
- Nuclear reactor
