= Fusion ignition =

Term in nuclear physics

Fusion ignition is the point at which a nuclear fusion reaction becomes self-sustaining. This occurs when the energy being given off by the reaction heats the fuel mass more rapidly than it cools. In other words, fusion ignition is the point at which the increasing self-heating of the nuclear fusion removes the need for external heating. This is quantified by the Lawson criterion. Ignition can also be defined by the fusion energy gain factor.

In the laboratory, fusion ignition defined by the Lawson criterion was first achieved in August 2021, and ignition defined by the energy gain factor was achieved in December 2022, both by the U.S. National Ignition Facility.

== Research ==
Schematic of the stages of inertial confinement fusion using lasers. The blue arrows represent radiation; orange is blowoff; yellow is inwardly transported thermal energy.: 1. Laser beams or laser-produced X-rays rapidly heat the surface of the fusion target, forming a surrounding plasma envelope.; 2. Fuel is compressed by the rocket-like blowoff of the hot surface material.; 3. During the final part of the capsule implosion, the fuel core reaches 20 times the density of lead and ignites at 100,000,000 ˚C.; 4. Thermonuclear burn spreads rapidly through the compressed fuel, yielding many times the input energy.

Ignition should not be confused with breakeven, a similar concept that compares the total energy being given off to the energy being used to heat the fuel. The key difference is that breakeven ignores losses to the surroundings, which do not contribute to heating the fuel, and thus are not able to make the reaction self-sustaining. Breakeven is an important goal in the fusion energy field, but ignition is required for a practical energy producing design.

In nature, stars reach ignition at temperatures similar to that of the Sun, around 15 million kelvins (27 million degrees F). Stars are so large that the fusion products will almost always interact with the plasma before their energy can be lost to the environment at the outside of the star. In comparison, man-made reactors are far less dense and much smaller, allowing the fusion products to easily escape the fuel. To offset this, much higher rates of fusion are required, and thus much higher temperatures; most man-made fusion reactors are designed to work at temperatures over 100 million kelvins (180 million degrees F).

Fusion ignition was first achieved by humans in the cores of detonating thermonuclear weapons. A thermonuclear weapon uses a conventional fission (U-235 or Pu-239/241) "sparkplug" to generate high pressures and compress a rod of fusion fuel (usually lithium deuteride). The fuel reaches high enough pressures and densities to ignite, releasing large amounts of energy and neutrons in the process.

The National Ignition Facility at Lawrence Livermore National Laboratory performs laser-driven inertial confinement fusion experiments that achieve fusion ignition. This is similar to a thermonuclear weapon, but the National Ignition Facility uses a 1.8 MJ laser system instead of a fission weapon to compress the fuel, and uses a much smaller amount of fuel (a mixture of deuterium and tritium, which are both isotopes of hydrogen). In January 2012, National Ignition Facility Director Mike Dunne predicted in a Photonics West 2012 plenary talk that ignition would be achieved at NIF by October 2012. By 2022 the NIF had achieved ignition.

Based on the tokamak reactor design, the ITER is intended to sustain fusion mostly by internal fusion heating and yield in its plasma a ten-fold return on power. Construction is expected to be completed in 2025.

Experts believe that achieving fusion ignition is the first step towards electricity generation using fusion power.

== 2021 and 2022 ignition reports ==
The National Ignition Facility at the Lawrence Livermore National Laboratory in California reported in 2021 that it had triggered ignition in the laboratory on 8 August 2021, for the first time in the over-60-year history of the ICF program. The shot yielded 1.3 megajoules of fusion energy, an 8-fold improvement on tests done in spring 2021. NIF estimates that the laser supplied 1.9 megajoules of energy, 230 kilojoules of which reached the fuel capsule. This corresponds to a total scientific energy gain of 0.7 and a capsule energy gain of 6. While the experiment fell short of ignition as defined by the National Academy of Sciences – a total energy gain greater than one – most people working in the field viewed the experiment as the demonstration of ignition as defined by the Lawson criterion.

In August 2022, the results of the experiment were confirmed in three peer-reviewed papers: one in Physical Review Letters and two in Physical Review E. Throughout 2022, the NIF researchers tried and failed to replicate the August result. However, on 13 December 2022, the United States Department of Energy announced via Twitter that an experiment on December 5 had surpassed the August result, achieving a scientific gain of 1.5, surpassing the National Academy of Sciences definition of ignition.

== See also ==
- Burning plasma
- Inertial confinement fusion
- Laser Mégajoule
- Timeline of nuclear fusion
