= Edward Teller Award =

- Country: United States
- Presented by: American Nuclear Society
- Rewards: $2,000 and engraved silver medal
- First award: 1999
- Website: www.ans.org/honors/award-teller/

The Edward Teller Award (or the Edward Teller Medal) is an award presented every two years by the American Nuclear Society for "pioneering research and leadership in the use of laser and ion-particle beams to produce unique high-temperature and high-density matter for scientific research and for controlled thermonuclear fusion". It was established in 1999 and is named after Edward Teller. The award carries a $2000 cash prize and an engraved silver medal.

== Recipients ==
Year	Recipient	Citation	Ref.
1991	Nikolai G. Basov		
1991	Heinrich Hora		
1991	John H. Nuckolls		
1991	Chiyoe Yamanaka		
1993	Robert Dautray		
1993	John D. Lindl		
1993	Sadao Nakai		
1995	E. Michael Campbell		
1995	Gennady A. Kirillov		
1995	Robert L. McCrory		
1995	George H. Miley		
1997	Michael H. Key		
1997	Jürgen Meyer-ter-Vehn		
1997	Guillermo Velarde		
1997	George Zimmerman		
1999	Larry R. Foreman		
1999	Steven W. Haan		
1999	Dov Shvarts		
2001	Mordecai Rosen		
2001	Stefano Atzeni		
2003	Hideaki Takabe		
2003	Laurance J. Suter		
2005	Joseph D. Kilkenny	"for his many significant and seminal contributions to advancing inertial confinement fusion as an experimentalist, for his international leadership and initiative in encouraging collaboration in inertial fusion research, and for advising and mentoring many fine research scientists who are contributing to the growing field of high-energy-density science."	
2005	Max Tabak	"for developing the Fast Ignition inertial fusion concept and for demonstrating key aspects of it in a series of experiments that have catalyzed the world-wide effort on the concept."	
2007	Kunioki Mima	"in recognition of pioneering research and leadership in Inertial Fusion Sciences and Applications."	
2007	Brian R. Thomas	"in recognition of pioneering research and leadership in Inertial Fusion Sciences and Applications."	
2009	Edward I. Moses	"in recognition of pioneering research and leadership in Inertial Fusion Sciences and Applications."	
2009	Riccardo Betti	"for seminal contributions to the theory of hydrodynamic instabilities, implosion dynamics and thermonuclear ignition in inertial confinement fusion."	
2011	Christine Labaune	"for seminal experimental contributions to laser fusion research, notably for her work to control and understand laser coupling and parametric instabilities."	
2011	Bruce A. Remington	"in recognition of pioneering research and leadership in Inertial Fusion Sciences and Applications."	
2013	James Hammer	"in recognition of his engendering innovative techniques for pursuing inertial confinement fusion and studying high energy density science with lasers and pulsed-power drivers."	
2013	Richard Petrasso	"in recognition of his leadership in implementing innovating nuclear-based diagnostics on OMEGA and the NIF resulting in multiple scientific breakthroughs."	
2015	Hiroshi Azechi		
2015	Zhang Jie	"in recognition of his significant contributions to the study of generation and propagation of hot electrons in laser-plasmas relevant to ICF and the reproduction of astrophysical processes."	
2017	R. Paul Drake		
2017	Vladimir Tikhonchuk		
2019	Xian-Tu He		
2019	Patrick Mora		
2021	Omar Hurricane	For "visionary scientific insights and leadership of National Ignition Facility (NIF) experiments resulting in the achievement of fuel gain, an alpha-heating-dominated plasma, and a burning plasma."	
2021	Ryosuke Kodama		
2023	Otto Landen	"for his pioneering contributions to ICF and high energy density science (HEDS) and for (his) leadership in achieving ignition on the National Ignition Facility (NIF.")	
2023	Peter Norreys	"for his influential work in using lasers to generate particles for scientific applications such as fast ignition fusion."	
2025	Siegfried H. Glenzer	"(SLAC, USA) for his visionary leadership in advancing critical capabilities enabling ignition at the National Ignition Facility, his pioneering contributions to fundamental scientific understanding, and his transformative impact on mentoring and training the next generation of leaders in High Energy Density Science and Inertial Confinement Fusion."	
2025	Hye-Sook Park	"(LLNL, USA) for her pioneering high-energy density experimental work in high pressure materials science, inertial confinement fusion, and astrophysical collisionless shock generation, the resulting particle acceleration, and magnetic field generation."	

== See also ==
- List of physics awards
- List of prizes named after people

== Publications ==
- Edward Teller lectures : lasers and inertial fusion energy. Hora, Heinrich, 1931-, Miley, George H. (George Hunter), 1933-. London: Imperial College. 2005. ISBN 1-86094-727-1. OCLC 232159974.
- Hora, Heinrich. (2016). Edward Teller Lectures : Lasers and Inertial Fusion Energy. Miley, George H. (2nd ed.). Singapore: Imperial College Press. ISBN 978-1-911299-66-0. OCLC 959148764.
