= John Lindl =

American physicist (born 1946)

John D. Lindl
- Born: July 27, 1946 (age 79); Toledo, Ohio
- Education: Cornell University (B.S.); Princeton University (M.S., Ph.D.)
- Awards: Edward Teller Award (1993); James Clerk Maxwell Prize for Plasma Physics (2007)
- Scientific career
- Fields: Plasma physics
- Thesis: Turbulent electron viscosity due to electrostatic instabilities in plasmas with large current shears (1972)
- Doctoral advisor: John M. Dawson

John D. Lindl (born July 27, 1946 in Toledo, Ohio) is an American physicist who specializes in inertial confinement fusion (ICF). He is currently the chief scientist of the National Ignition Facility at the Lawrence Livermore National Laboratory.

== Early life and career ==
Lindl obtained a B.S in engineering physics from Cornell University in 1968 and a Ph.D. in astrophysics from Princeton University in 1972. His Ph.D. thesis advisor was John M. Dawson.

In the same year, Lindl joined the Lawrence Livermore National Laboratory (LLNL), where he worked for John Nuckolls in the early days of inertial fusion research (e.g. optimal target design for lasers and particle beams, hydrodynamic instabilities, plasma development in the cavity and cavity design, implosion symmetry). In 1976, he was involved in the design of the first laser fusion experiments with the Cyclops laser. In 1983, he was deputy program manager for theory and target design in the ICF program of the LLNL. In 1990, he became head of the Nova Laser program to demonstrate the use of a 1 to 2 megajoule laser for inertial fusion. After the ICF research at LLNL became declassified in 1993, Lindl wrote an overview article in Physics of Plasmas, which then led to his book on inertial fusion in 1997. Lindl became the chief scientist at the National Ignition Facility in 2005, whose construction began in 1997 and was inaugurated in 2009 (with the first large-scale laser target experiments).

He has also recently been involved in magnetic fusion research at the LLNL's Sustained Spheromak Physics Experiment (SSPX).

== Honors and awards ==
Lindl is a fellow of the American Physical Society and the American Association for the Advancement of Science. He has received awards such as the American Nuclear Society's Edward Teller Award in 1993, the Ernest Orlando Lawrence Award in 1994, and the Fusion Power Associates Leaders Award in 2000.

In 2007, Lindl received the James Clerk Maxwell Prize for Plasma Physics for "30 years of continuous plasma physics contributions in high energy density physics and inertial confinement fusion research and scientific management".

== Books ==
- Lindl, John D. (1998). Inertial confinement fusion : the quest for ignition and energy gain using indirect drive. AIP Press. ISBN 1-56396-662-X. OCLC 38055919.
