= Jean-Pierre Aguilar =

French entrepreneur

Jean-Pierre Aguilar (9 August 1960 – 4 July 2009) was a French entrepreneur. He is best known as the co-founder and chief executive of Capital Fund Management.

== Biography ==
Jean-Pierre Aguilar studied engineering and computer science at the Grenoble Institute of Technology, before receiving his business degree from the HEC Paris.

He started his financial career in 1986, working for the brokerage firm LeGrand before leaving in 1988 to found the finance software company Ubitrade.

In 1991, he co-founded Capital Fund Management, which rapidly grew into France's largest and most successful hedge fund. In 1994, along with Jean-Philippe Bouchaud he set up the Science & Finance research society, which conducted scientific work on a consultancy basis, while working exclusively for CFM on financial research. In 2000, the two entities merged.

In 2004, Aguilar sold Ubitrade to GL Trade for an undisclosed amount.

== Death ==
On the morning of 4 July 2009, Aguilar died aged 48 during a gliding accident near the airport of Barcelonnette, a town in the French Alps. His co-pilot, Michel Fache, president of the local gliding club, also died in the crash.

The succession plan set in place by Aguilar for Capital Fund Management was hailed as an example for corporate succession planning during emergencies.
