= Élie Belorizky =

- Born: 4 August 1939
- Education: Doctor of Science
- Alma mater: University of Grenoble
- Occupation: University teacher, writer
- Employer: Joseph Fourier University

Élie Belorizky (born August 4, 1939) is a French professor emeritus of Physics at the Université Joseph-Fourier. Belorizky written more than one hundred articles in scientific journals, and together with Yves Ayant, has developed physics and mathematics textbooks and exercises for university teaching.

== Life ==
=== Education ===
From 1966 Belorizky holds a ScD in Physics with the thesis Étude de la structure et de l'élargissement des raies de résonance électronique d'ions terre rare ayant un fondamental cristallin [Gamma] 8 en symétrie cubique.

Academic work

He holds a scientific collaborator position at the Interdisciplinary Physics Laboratory (LIPhy) of the Grenoble Alpes University. He also is a scientific assessor to the CEA Grenoble with the Technological Research Directorate (DRT) where he is working on medical images generated by NMR.

Belorizky was named to a post-doctoral role in the Department of Theoretical Physics at the University of Oxford. He also serves as the chairman for the habilitation committee at the Université Joseph-Fourier (UJF Physics Department), and has supervised the theses of Karine Lang-Humblot, Marc Jeannin, Marie-Pierre Ferroud-Plattet and has been chairman of the jury of Pascal Roos and Dominique Boutigny.

== Works ==
Thesis

- Belorizky, Élie (1966). Étude de la structure et de l'élargissement des raies de résonance électronique d'ions terre rare ayant un fondamental cristallin [Gamma] 8 en symétrie cubique (Thesis). OCLC 43036555.

Books

- Belorizky, Élie; Ayant, Yves (1969). Cours de mécanique quantique: maîtrise de physique (in French).
- ——————; Ayant, Yves (1995). Cours de mathématiques pour la physique. Collection Grenoble sciences (in French). Université Joseph Fourier. ISBN 978-2-908019-43-8.
- ——————; Ayant, Yves (2000-05-10). Mécanique quantique. Avec exercices et problemes résouls. Sciences Sup. (in French) (3rd ed.). Dunod. ISBN 978-2-10-004742-0.
- ——————; Ayant, Yves (2007). Mécanique quantique. Cours avec 87 exercices corrigés. Sciences Sup. Cours et exercices corrigés - Master - Ecoles d'ingénieur (in French) (3rd ed.). Dunod. ISBN 978-2-10-051019-1.
- —————— (2015). Outils mathématiques à l'usage des scientifiques et ingénieurs.
