= Johan Frenje =

Swedish-American plasma physicist

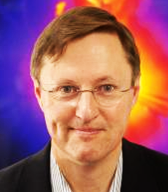
- Born: 1967 (age 58–59); Sweden
- Education: Uppsala University (1992 M.Sc.); Uppsala University (1998 Ph.D.)
- Scientific career
- Fields: Plasma physics, Applied nuclear physics
- Workplaces: Massachusetts Institute of Technology
- Thesis: Instrumentation for fusion neutron measurements and experimentation at JET (1998)

Johan Frenje (born 1967) is a Swedish-American physicist who conducts research in the areas of High-Energy-Density Physics (HEDP), Inertial Confinement Fusion (ICF), and Inertial Fusion Energy (IFE). Frenje works at the Massachusetts Institute of Technology as a Senior Research Scientist and serves as the Head of the HEDP Division at the MIT Plasma Science and Fusion Center.

== Education and career ==
Frenje earned a Master's Degree in Engineering Physics from Uppsala University in Sweden in 1992, followed by a Ph.D. in Applied Nuclear Physics in 1998. His work as a graduate student involved the implementation and use of neutron spectrometry in support of the first high-power deuterium-tritium campaign at the Joint European Torus Tokamak in 1997.

Frenje was a Postdoctoral Associate at the MIT Plasma Science and Fusion Center from 1999 to 2001, before becoming a permanent member of the research staff. In 2013 he was promoted to Principal Research Scientist. In 2017, Frenje gained a promotion to Senior Research Scientist, as well as Assistant Head of the HEDP Division at the Plasma Science and Fusion Center. He later became the Head of the HEDP Division in 2021.

Frenje has been serving on the Executive Committee for the High Temperature Plasma Diagnostics conference since 2014, and has been a member of the Scientific Advisory Board for Institute of Laser Engineering at Osaka University since 2023. From 2015 to 2018, he was the Chair of ICF-HEDP National Ignition Implosion Physics (NISP) Working Group, an effort initiated by the National Nuclear Security Administration (NNSA). Frenje has also served as Co-Chair and Chair of the Executive Committee of the Omega Laboratory Users Group between 2016 and 2023; and as a member of the Executive Steering Committee for the National Diagnostic Planning effort, initiated by the NNSA, from 2014 to 2023.

With his students, Frenje builds and operates diagnostics in support of the ICF programs at the Laboratory for Laser Energetics, the National Ignition Facility (NIF), and the Z Pulsed Power Facility. At these ICF facilities he has developed his research in high-energy-density plasma and nuclear physics. In 2022, he and his team contributed to the experimental campaigns at the NIF, achieving ignition and net energy gain. He has also collaborated with companies in the private sector; such as Commonwealth Fusion Systems, Pacific Fusion, Focused Energy, and Avalanche Energy.

== Recognition ==
As part of the Burning Plasma Team of the National Ignition Facility, Frenje received the John Dawson Award for Excellence in Plasma Physics Research from the APS in 2022, given for "...the first laboratory demonstration of a burning deuterium-tritium plasma where alpha heating dominates the plasma energetics". Frenje was also the recipient of the Fusion Power Associates Leadership award in 2023, the 2021, 2022 and 2024 National Nuclear Security Administration Secretary's Honor Award, and the 2023 Department of Energy Secretary's Achievement Award. He was named a Fellow of the American Physical Society, Division of Plasma Physics in 2012 "for pioneering development of unique neutron diagnostic methods and their utilization in inertial confinement fusion research, particularly in assessing implosion performance in fundamental and applied nuclear-science experiments ".
