= Jürgen Meyer-ter-Vehn =

German theoretical physicist (born 1940)

- Born: 16 February 1940 (age 86); Berlin, Germany
- Education: University of Münster; LMU Munich; Technical University of Munich (PhD)
- Awards: Edward Teller Award (1997); Hannes Alfvén Prize (2009)
- Scientific career
- Fields: Plasma physics
- Thesis: (1969)

Jürgen Meyer-ter-Vehn (born 16 February 1940 in Berlin, Germany) is a German theoretical physicist who specializes in laser-plasma interactions at the Max Planck Institute for Quantum Optics. He published under the name Meyer until 1973.

Meyer-ter-Vehn's work involved examining the physical principles of inertial fusion with lasers and heavy ion beams. In the 2000s, he dealt with relativistic laser-plasma interaction (where, for example, due to the relativistic increase in mass, new effects occur such as induced transparency and self-focusing with channel formation) and with the formation of plasma blocks by ultra-short terawatt laser pulses for laser fusion (fast ignition). He also further developed the concept of the wakefield accelerators for generating extremely high electric fields by laser-induced charge separation in plasma by John M. Dawson (a possible accelerator concept).

== Life ==
From 1959, Meyer-ter-Vehn studied physics at the University of Münster and LMU Munich as a scholarship holder of the German National Academic Foundation, where he obtained his diploma in 1966. In 1969, he received his doctorate in theoretical nuclear physics from the Technical University of Munich. He researched at the Technical University of Munich, the Lawrence Berkeley National Laboratory, the Paul Scherrer Institute and the Jülich Research Center. In 1976, he habilitated at the Technical University of Munich, where he has been an associate professor since 1997. From 1979, he was in the laser research group of the Max Planck Institute for Plasma Physics in Munich, from which the Max Planck Institute for Quantum Optics emerged in 1981. Until 2005, he was group leader for laser plasma theory.

Until the end of the 1970s, he mainly dealt with theoretical nuclear physics.

He was married to Helga Meyer-ter-Vehn (died 2011) and has two sons, Tobias Meyer-ter-Vehn and Moritz Meyer-ter-Vehn, and four granddaughters, Rebekka, Lili, Clara, and Sophie.

== Honors and awards ==
In 1997, Meyer-ter-Vehn received the American Nuclear Society's Edward Teller Award. In 2009, he received the Hannes Alfvén Prize from the European Physical Society for "his seminal theoretical work in the fields of inertial confinement fusion (ICF), relativistic laser–plasma interaction and laser wakefield electron acceleration".

== Books ==
Atzeni, S.; Meyer-ter-Vehn, J. (2004). The physics of inertial fusion: beam plasma interaction, hydrodynamics, hot dense matter. Oxford: Clarendon Press. ISBN 978-0-19-856264-1. OCLC 56645784.
