= Riccardo Betti =

American mechanical engineer

- Born: Rome, Italy (1963)
- Occupation: Professor at University of Rochester

Riccardo Betti is the Robert L. McCrory professor of Mechanical Engineering and Physics and Astronomy at the University of Rochester, in Rochester, NY. From 2004 to 2015, he also acted as the Director of the Fusion Science Center at the Laboratory for Laser Energetics. He received is Ph.D. from the Department of Nuclear Engineering at the Massachusetts Institute of Technology (Cambridge, MA) in 1992. Prior to that he studied at the University of Rome (Italy), where he graduated with honors with a degree in Nuclear Engineering in 1987.

== Honors and awards ==
Dr. Betti was the Chair of the American Physical Society's Division of Plasma Physics (November, 2014-October 2015).

His awards and recognitions include:

2024 John Dawson Award for Excellence in Plasma Physics Research from the American Physical Society "for pioneering the development of statistical modeling to predict, design, and analyze implosion experiments on the 30kJ OMEGA laser, achieving hot spot energy gains above unity and record Lawson triple products for direct-drive laser fusion."

2023 Blaise Pascal Medal in Physics from the European Academy of Science "in recognition for his outstanding contributions to high temperature plasma physics with applications to nuclear fusion and for the development of the novel "shock ignition" approach to direct-drive inertial confinement fusion."

2020 Landau-Spitzer Award from the American and European Physical Societies for Outstanding Contributions to Plasma Physics.

2012 recipient of the U.S. Department of Energy's Ernest O. Lawrence Award for "a series of impactful theoretical discoveries in the physics of inertial confinement fusion including seminal transformative work on thermonuclear ignition, hydrodynamic instabilities and implosion dynamics, and the development of innovative approaches to ignition and energy gains."

2010 Leadership Award from Fusion Power Associates "for the leadership he has been providing to the U.S. and world inertial fusion efforts, including his contributions to the search for efficient methods of igniting fusion targets, contributions to the emerging field of high energy density physics, and his advisory role in the DOE's Fusion Energy Sciences Advisory Committee."

2009, The Edward Teller Medal from the American Nuclear Society "for seminal contributions to the theory and understanding of hydrodynamic instabilities, implosion dynamics and thermonuclear ignition in inertial confinement fusion."

He has been a Fellow at the American Physical Society since 2001. In 2010, he was appointed to the Board of Physics and Astronomy of the National Academy of Sciences. He was Vice Chair of the Fusion Energy Science Committee of the Department of Energy.

On October 29, 2009, Dr Betti gave a statement to the U.S. House of Representative's Committee on Science and Technology Subcommittee on Energy and Environment on the "Next Generation of Fusion Energy Research".
