= Ed Moses =

Ed Moses may refer to:

- Ed Moses (artist) (1926–2018), American abstract artist
- Edwin Moses (born 1955), American 400 meter-hurdler
- Ed Moses (swimmer) (born 1980), American swimmer
- Ed Moses (physicist), American physicist
