= Leticia Cugliandolo =

Argentine condensed matter physicist

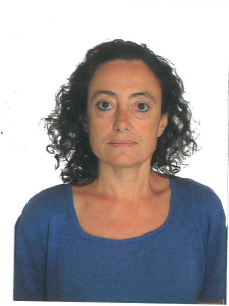
Leticia Cugliandolo

Leticia Fernanda Cugliandolo (born 1965) is an Argentine condensed matter physicist known for her research on non-equilibrium thermodynamics, spin glass, and glassy systems. She works in France as a professor of physics at the Sorbonne University.

The Cugliandolo–Kurchan equations, two integro-differential equations describing the behavior of spin glass, are named for her and her coauthor Jorge Kurchan, another Argentine physicist, after their studies of these equations.

Her most significant contributions include: the proof, in collaboration with Jorge Kurchan, that mean-field disordered models can effectively describe the physical aging of glasses; the definition and analysis of an effective temperature in the context of macroscopic systems undergoing slow out-of-equilibrium relaxation (with J. Kurchan and L. Peliti); the development of a mean-field theory for the relaxation of open quantum disordered systems (with G. Lozano); and the use of time reparametrization invariance to characterize the spatio-temporal fluctuations in glassy systems (with H. Castillo, C. Chamon, and M. Kennett). More recently, her research has focused on the phase and dynamic behavior of dense active matter systems (with G. Gonnella, D. Levis and PhD students and post-docs).

Leticia Cugliandolo serves as the Deputy Editor-in-Chief of Advances in Physics and as the Chief Scientific Director of the Journal of Statistical Mechanics: Theory and Experiment.

== Education and career ==
Cugliandolo is originally from Mar del Plata. She earned a degree in physics from the National University of Mar del Plata in 1988 with a thesis under the advice of Eduardo Fradkin and Fidel A. Schaposnik, and completed a doctorate at the National University of La Plata in 1991, under the supervision of Fidel A. Schaposnik. She earned a habilitation at Pierre and Marie Curie University in 2000.

After completing her doctorate, she was a postdoctoral researcher at the National University of La Plata, Sapienza University of Rome, and Pierre and Marie Curie University, before becoming a researcher for the French National Centre for Scientific Research (CNRS) in 1996, associated with the laboratory for theoretical physics of the École normale supérieure (Paris). She became an associate professor at the École normale supérieure in 1997, returned briefly to the CNRS in 2002, and in the same year visited Harvard University as a Guggenheim Fellow. In 2003 she became a full professor with Pierre and Marie Curie University. She was also director of the École de physique des Houches from 2007 to 2017, and worked half-time for the CNRS from 2009 to 2014. In 2018, Pierre and Marie Curie University merged with several other institutions to become Sorbonne University, where she continues as a full professor.

== Recognition ==
Cugliandolo has been a member of the Institut Universitaire de France for three terms, 2004–2009, 2014–2019, and 2019–2024. She won the Prix Paul Langevin in 2002, and in the same year won the Marie Curie award of the European Commission. She won the Irène Joliot-Curie Prize for female scientist of the year in 2015. In 2024 she was elected International Member of the National Academy of Sciences of the USA and she received the Premio Raices from Argentina. She received the 2025 Lars Onsager Prize of the American Physical Society jointly with Jean-Philippe Bouchaud and Jorge Kurchan.
