= Labaune =

Labaune is a French surname. Notable people with the surname include:

- Christine Labaune, French physicist
- Noël Labaune, French rally car driver in 1975 Monte Carlo Rally
- Patrick Labaune (born 1951), French politician
