= Patrick Mora =

French theoretical plasma physicist (born 1952)

- Education: Université Paris-Sud (Ph.D.)
- Known for: Laser-plasma physics
- Awards: Paul Langevin Prize (1997); Hannes Alfvén Prize (2014); Edward Teller Award (2019)
- Scientific career
- Fields: Plasma physics
- Thesis: Génération de champs magnétique dans l'interaction non linéaire rayonnement-plasma, et expansion des plasmas créés par laser (1980)

Patrick Mora (born 1952) is a French theoretical plasma physicist who specializes in laser-plasma interactions. He was awarded the 2014 Hannes Alfvén Prize and 2019 Edward Teller Award for his contributions to the field of laser-plasma physics.

Mora is a research director of the French National Centre for Scientific Research (CNRS) and a professor at the École Polytechnique in Paris, where he is also director of the Institut Lasers et Plasmas (Institute for Lasers and Plasmas).

== Early life and career ==
Mora studied from 1971 to 1975 at the École normale supérieure. In 1975, he received his agrégation in physics and in 1980 he received his doctorate from Université Paris-Sud. From 1975 to 1982, he did research at the Saclay Nuclear Research Centre and from 1982 for the French National Centre for Scientific Research. Since 1989, he has also been a professor at the École Polytechnique. In 2001, he became director of the Center for Theoretical Physics and in 2009, the director of the Institute for Lasers and Plasmas.

== Scientific contributions ==
Mora developed a widely used model of the interaction of laser light with plasmas in connection with energy transport in plasma and plasma hydrodynamics. With his colleague Jean-Francois Luciani, he also developed a nonlinear and non-local theory of heat transport in a plasma via electrons. This has applications in improving numerical simulations in laser-driven inertial fusion. With Tom Antonsen, he developed a model of the propagation of laser pulses in non-dense plasmas that revealed their tendency to self-focus or to display Raman scattering. Mora developed a theory of the expansion of plasmas into vacuum, which explains the flow dynamics and structure of the ion front. His theories are used to explain ion and electron beam acceleration experiments.

== Honors and awards ==
In 1997, he received the Paul Langevin Prize from the Société Française de Physique.

In 2014, he received the Hannes Alfvén Prize from the European Physical Society for "decisive results in the field of laser-produced plasma physics, in particular for illuminating descriptions of laser light absorption in plasmas, electron heat transport in steep temperature gradients and plasma expansion dynamics into vacuum".

In 2019, he received the Edward Teller Award from the American Nuclear Society for "his scientific contributions to laser-plasma physics, from laser from laser light absorption to non-local electron heat transport and plasma expansion dynamics, and for his inspiring spirit of community service".
