= Costas Kounnas =

Cypriot theoretical physicist (1952–2022)

Costas Christou Kounnas (Κώστας Χρήστου Κουννάς, 23 January 1952 – 21 January 2022) was a Cypriot theoretical physicist, known for his research on string theory, supersymmetry, supergravity, GUTs, and quantum chromodynamics.

== Biography ==
Kounnas born in Famagusta. After graduating in 1969 from Famagusta's Greek High School for Boys, he graduated with honors from the School of Physics and Mathematics of the University of Athens. With a scholarship from the French government, he became in 1975 a graduate student at the ENS Paris, where he received his doctorate in 1981. While studying in Paris he married the Famagusta-native Kakia Alexandrou. The couple's son is Christian Kounnas.

Costas Kounnas then worked at CERN (1982 to 1984) and the University of California, Berkeley (1984 to 1987) before returning to the ENS in 1987 as Research Director of the CNRS. From 1992 to 1999 he was a staff member in the Theory Division of CERN.

He was a visiting professor at Stanford University, the University of California at Los Angeles (UCLA), and Harvard University.

In 1987, with Ignatios Antoniadis and Constantin Bachas, he developed superstring models in four dimensions. Their research initiated much further research in string theory. He was involved in elucidating the properties of supergravity and their influence on and relationship to string theory. He also worked on string cosmology.

Kounnas received in 1995 the Paul Langevin Prize and in 2013 the Gay-Lussac-Humboldt Prize. He received a Humboldt Research Award for the academic year 2014–2015, during which he collaborated with Dieter Lüst at LMU Munich.

Over many years, Kounnas made important contributions to establishing and developing the scientific meetings at EISA's Corfu Summer Institute.

== Selected publications ==
- with E. G. Floratos, R. Lacaze: Higher order QCD effects in inclusive annihilation and deep inelastic scattering, Nucl. Phys. B, vol. 192, 1981, pp. 417–462 doi:10.1016/0550-3213(81)90434-X (over 400 citations)
- with Eugène Cremmer, Sergio Ferrara, Dimitri Nanopoulos: Naturally vanishing cosmological constant in N= 1 supergravity, Phys. Lett. B, vol. 133, 1983, pp. 61–66 doi:10.1016/0370-2693(83)90106-5 (over 1000 citations)
- with John Ellis, D. V. Nanopoulos: No-scale supersymmetric GUTs, Nucl. Phys. B, vol. 247, 1984, pp. 373–395 doi:10.1016/0550-3213(84)90555-8 (over 650 citations)
- with J. Ellis, D. V. Nanopoulos: Phenomenological SU (1, 1) supergravity, Nucl. Phys. B, vol. 241, 1984, pp. 406–428 doi:10.1016/0550-3213(84)90054-3 (over 500 citations)
- with A. B. Lahanas, D. V. Nanopoulos, M. Quirós: Low-energy behaviour of realistic locally-supersymmetric grand unified theories, Nucl. Phys. B, vol. 236, 1984, pp. 438–466 doi:10.1016/0550-3213(84)90545-5 (over 450 citations)
- with E. Cremmer, A. Van Proeyen, J. P. Derendinger, S. Ferrara: B. de Wit, L. Girardello: Vector multiplets coupled to N= 2 supergravity: super-Higgs effect, flat potentials and geometric structure, Nucl. Phys. B, vol. 250, 1985, pp. 385–426 doi:10.1016/0550-3213(85)90488-2 (over 400 citations)
- with S. Ferrara, M. Porrati: General dimensional reduction of ten-dimensional supergravity and superstring, Phys. Lett. B, vol. 181, 1986, pp. 263–268 doi:10.1016/0370-2693(86)90043-2
- with I. Antoniadis, C. Bachas: Four-dimensional Superstrings. In: Nucl. Phys. B, vol. 289, 1987, pp. 87–108 doi:10.1016/0550-3213(87)90372-5 (over 1000 citations)
- mit M. Porrati: Spontaneous supersymmetry breaking in string theory, Nucl. Phys. B, vol. 310, 1988, pp. 355–370 doi:10.1016/0550-3213(88)90153-8 (over 300 citations)
- with S. Ferrara, M. Porrati, F. Zwirner: Superstrings with spontaneously broken supersymmetry and their effective theories, Nucl. Phys. B, vol. 318, 1989, pp. 75–105 doi:10.1016/0550-3213(89)90048-5 (over 350 citations)
- with J. P. Derendinger, S. Ferrara, F. Zwirner: On loop corrections to string effective field theories: field-dependent gauge couplings and σ-model anomalies, Nucl. Phys. B, vol. 372, 1992, pp. 145–188 doi:10.1016/0550-3213(92)90315-3 (over 400 citations)
- with S. Ferrara, F. Zwirner: Mass formulae and natural hierarchy in string effective supergravities, Nucl. Phys. B, vol. 429, 1994, pp. 589–625 doi:10.1016/0550-3213(94)90154-6
- with Nicolaos Toumbas: Aspects of String Cosmology, Corfu Summer Institute 2012, arxiv.org preprint
