= Prix Paul Langevin =

The prix Paul-Langevin is a prize created in 1956 and named in honor of Paul Langevin. It has been awarded each year since 1957 by the Société française de physique (SFP). The prize honors French physicists for work in theoretical physics.

The prix Paul Langevin should not be confused with the prix Langevin, which is a prize awarded in mathematics, physics, chemistry, or biology by the Académie des sciences.

== Recipients ==
- 1957 Yves Ayant
- 1958 Jacques Winter
- 1959 Roland Omnès
- 1960 Philippe Nozières
- 1961 Cyrano de Dominicis
- 1962 Jacques Villain
- 1963 Claude Cohen-Tannoudji
- 1964 Marcel Froissart
- 1965 Robert Arvieu
- 1966 Roger Balian
- 1967 Jean Lascoux
- 1968 Émile Daniel
- 1969 Jean Ginibre
- 1970 Daniel Bessis
- 1971 Loup Verlet
- 1972 Claude Itzykson
- 1973 André Neveu
- 1974 Édouard Brézin
- 1975 Dominique Vautherin
- 1976 Gérard Toulouse
- 1977 Jean Zinn-Justin
- 1978 Jean Iliopoulos
- 1979 Richard Schaeffer
- 1980 Roland Seneor and Jacques Magnen
- 1981 Yves Pomeau
- 1982 Pierre Fayet
- 1983 Serge Aubry
- 1984 Thibault Damour
- 1985 Mannque Rho
- 1986 Bernard Julia
- 1987 Bernard Souillard
- 1988 Paul Manneville
- 1989 Jean Bellissard
- 1990 Pierre Coullet
- 1991 Jean-Bernard Zuber
- 1992 Rémy Mosseri
- 1993 Jean-François Joanny
- 1994 Dominique Escande
- 1995 Costas Kounnas
- 1996 Vincent Hakim
- 1997 Patrick Mora
- 1998 Denis Bernard
- 1999 Pierre Binétruy
- 2000 Jean-Louis Barrat
- 2001 Vincent Pasquier
- 2002 Leticia Cugliandolo and Jorge Kurchan
- 2004 Bart Van Tiggelen
- 2005 Satya Majumdar
- 2008 Rémi Monasson
- 2009 Alain Barrat
- 2010 Jean-Philippe Uzan
- 2015 François Gelis and Ubirajara van Kolck
- 2016 Silke Biermann and Jesper Jacobsen
- 2017 Olivier Bénichou and Raphaël Voituriez
- 2021 Mariana Grana and Cédric Deffayet
- 2022 Kirone Mallick
- 2023 Jean-Philippe Colombier
