= Dominique Franck Escande =

French physicist (born 1948)

Dominique Franck Escande (born 1948) is a French physicist. He is known for his research in foundations and methods of plasma physics, wave-particle interactions in plasmas, Hamiltonian dynamics, deterministic chaos, thermonuclear fusion by magnetic confinement, self-organization of the reversed field pinch, plasma-wall self-organization in magnetic fusion

== Education and career ==
After graduating in physics in 1967 from the École polytechnique, Dominique Franck Escande became a graduate student in physics at Paris-Sud University. There he graduated in 1971 with a diplôme d'études approfondies (DEA) and a Ph.D. in 1978. His Ph.D. thesis is entitled Ondes haute fréquence dans un plasma en présence de fluctuation de basse fréquence (High-frequency waves in a plasma in the presence of low-frequency fluctuation). From 1981 to 1992 he was a CNRS researcher at the École polytechnique, where he held an appointment as maître de conférences (assistant professor) in physics. During the years of his appointment at the École polytechnique, he also worked at several other scientific institutions. For the academic year 1983–1984 he was on sabbatical at the University of Texas at Austin's Institute for Fusion Studies (IFS) (which, among other things, was the principal site for USA-Japan collaboration on theory in fusion research). From 1987 to 1992 he was a part-time consultant for X-Recherche Service. In 1988 he created, in collaboration with Fabrice Doveil, the research team Equipe Turbulence Plasma inside laboratory Physique des Intéractions Ioniques et Moléculaires (PIIM) at Université de Provence in Marseille. From 1988 to 1992 Escande held an appointment as CNRS researcher in this laboratory.

Escande was from 1992 to 1996 the head of the Département de Recherches sur la Fusion Contrôlée at CEA-Cadarache, whose activity was centered on the Tore Supra tokamak group. From 1995 to 1996 he chaired the Euratom Fusion Technology Steering Committee-Implementation. At Consorzio RFX (Consortium RFX) in Padua, Italy, he was from 1996 to 1998 a full-time advisor and is since 1998 a part-time advisor. In 1998 he became a CNRS researcher at the laboratory PIIM, where he now has emeritus status as Directeur de Recherche Emérite.

He contributed three book chapters. He is the co-author with Yves Elskens (a physics professor at the University of Provence) of the book Microscopic dynamics of plasmas and chaos (2003, IOP Publishing); with a 2019 paperback edition published by CRC Press.

Escande is author or co-author of many scientific articles related to the device called the reverse field pinch (RFP) and is an internationally recognized expert on RFPs. More recently, he worked on plasma-wall self-organization.

His former doctoral student Didier Bénisti has acquired an international reputation in fusion research and plasma physics.

In 1994 Escande was awarded the Prix Paul Langevin.

== Selected publications ==
- Escande, D.F. (1975). "Saturation of the gentle bump instability in a random plasma, Phys. Rev. Letters, 35, 995
- Escande, D.F.; Doveil, F. (1981). "Renormalization method for the onset of stochasticity in a hamiltonian system". Physics Letters A. 83 (7): 307–310. Bibcode:1981PhLA...83..307E. doi:10.1016/0375-9601(81)90144-4.
- Escande, D. F.; Doveil, F. (1981). "Renormalization method for computing the threshold of the large-scale stochastic instability in two degrees of freedom Hamiltonian systems". Journal of Statistical Physics. 26 (2): 257–284. Bibcode:1981JSP....26..257E. doi:10.1007/BF01013171. S2CID 120359199.
- Tennyson, J. L.; Cary, John R.; Escande, D. F. (1986). "Change of the Adiabatic Invariant due to Separatrix Crossing". Physical Review Letters. 56 (20): 2117–2120. Bibcode:1986PhRvL..56.2117T. doi:10.1103/PhysRevLett.56.2117. PMID 10032895.
- Escande, D.F. (1985). "Stochasticity in classical Hamiltonian systems: Universal aspects". Physics Reports. 121 (3–4): 165–261. Bibcode:1985PhR...121..165E. doi:10.1016/0370-1573(85)90019-5.
- Cary, John R.; Escande, D. F.; Tennyson, J. L. (1986). "Adiabatic-invariant change due to separatrix crossing". Physical Review A. 34 (5): 4256–4275. Bibcode:1986PhRvA..34.4256C. doi:10.1103/PhysRevA.34.4256. PMID 9897774.
- Elskens, Y.; Escande, D. F. (1991). "Slowly pulsating separatrices sweep homoclinic tangles where islands must be small: An extension of classical adiabatic theory". Nonlinearity. 4 (3): 615–667. Bibcode:1991Nonli...4..615E. doi:10.1088/0951-7715/4/3/002. S2CID 250743647.
- Cary, John R.; Escande, D. F.; Verga, A. D. (December 1990). "Nonquasilinear diffusion far from the chaotic threshold". Physical Review Letters. 65 (25): 3132–3135. Bibcode:1990PhRvL..65.3132C. doi:10.1103/PhysRevLett.65.3132. PMID 10042789.
- Antoni, Mickaël; Elskens, Yves; Escande, Dominique F. (April 1998). "Explicit reduction of N-body dynamics to self-consistent particle–wave interaction". Physics of Plasmas. 5 (4): 841–852. Bibcode:1998PhPl....5..841A. doi:10.1063/1.872651.
- Bénisti, D.; Escande, D. F. (June 1998). "Nonstandard Diffusion Properties of the Standard Map". Physical Review Letters. 80 (22): 4871–4874. Bibcode:1998PhRvL..80.4871B. doi:10.1103/PhysRevLett.80.4871.
- Escande, D. F., Martin, P., Ortolani, S., Buffa, A., Franz, P., Marrelli, L., ... & Zanca, P. (2000). Quasi-single-helicity reversed-field-pinch plasmas. Physical review letters, 85(8), 1662.
- Escande, D. F., Paccagnella, R., Cappello, S., Marchetto, C., & D'Angelo, F. (2000). Chaos healing by separatrix disappearance and quasisingle helicity states of the reversed field pinch. Physical review letters, 85(15), 3169.
- Cappello, S., & Escande, D. F. (2000). Bifurcation in viscoresistive MHD: The Hartmann number and the reversed field pinch. Physical review letters, 85(18), 3838.
- Escande, D. F., & Elskens, Y. (2002). Proof of quasilinear equations in the chaotic regime of the weak warm beam instability. Physics Letters A, 302(2-3), 110-118.
- Escande, D. F., & Elskens, Y. (2003). Proof of quasilinear equations in the strongly nonlinear regime of the weak warm beam instability. Physics of Plasmas, 10(5), 1588-1594.
- Escande, D.F.; Ottaviani, M. (2004). "Simple and rigorous solution for the nonlinear tearing mode". Physics Letters A. 323 (3–4): 278–284. Bibcode:2004PhLA..323..278E. doi:10.1016/j.physleta.2004.02.010.
- Bonfiglio, D., Cappello, S., & Escande, D. F. (2005). Dominant electrostatic nature of the reversed field pinch dynamo. Physical review letters, 94(14), 145001.
- Arcis, N.; Escande, D. F.; Ottaviani, M. (2007). "Saturation of a tearing mode in zero-β full magnetohydrodynamics". Physics of Plasmas. 14 (3): 032308. Bibcode:2007PhPl...14c2308A. doi:10.1063/1.2710799.
- Escande, D. F.; Sattin, F. (2007-11-02). "When Can the Fokker-Planck Equation Describe Anomalous or Chaotic Transport?". Physical Review Letters. 99 (18) 185005. American Physical Society (APS). arXiv:0705.3737. Bibcode:2007PhRvL..99r5005E. doi:10.1103/physrevlett.99.185005. ISSN 0031-9007. PMID 17995418. S2CID 13040660.
- Besse, Nicolas; Elskens, Yves; Escande, D. F.; Bertrand, Pierre (2011). "Validity of quasilinear theory: Refutations and new numerical confirmation" (PDF). Plasma Physics and Controlled Fusion. 53 (2) 025012. Bibcode:2011PPCF...53b5012B. doi:10.1088/0741-3335/53/2/025012. S2CID 122380457.
- Escande, D. F., & Sattin, F. (2012). Calculation of transport coefficient profiles in modulation experiments as an inverse problem. Physical Review Letters, 108(12), 125007.
- Escande, D. F., Elskens, Y., & Doveil, F. (2015). Direct path from microscopic mechanics to Debye shielding, Landau damping and wave-particle interaction. Plasma Physics and Controlled Fusion, 57(2), 025017.
- Escande, D. F., Elskens, Y., & Doveil, F. (2015). Uniform derivation of Coulomb collisional transport thanks to Debye shielding. Journal of Plasma Physics, 81(1), 305810101.
- Escande, D. F., Doveil, F., & Elskens, Y. (2016). N-body description of Debye shielding and Landau damping. Plasma Physics and Controlled Fusion, 58(1), 014040.
- Escande, D. F. (2016). "Contributions of plasma physics to chaos and nonlinear dynamics". Plasma Physics and Controlled Fusion. 58 (11) 113001. arXiv:1604.06305. Bibcode:2016PPCF...58k3001E. doi:10.1088/0741-3335/58/11/113001. S2CID 32994770.
- Escande, D. F. (2018). From thermonuclear fusion to Hamiltonian chaos. The European Physical Journal H, 43(4), 397-420.
- Escande, D. F.; Bénisti, D.; Elskens, Y.; Zarzoso, D.; Doveil, F. (2018). "Basic microscopic plasma physics from N-body mechanics". Reviews of Modern Plasma Physics. 2 (1): 9. arXiv:1805.11408. Bibcode:2018RvMPP...2....9E. doi:10.1007/s41614-018-0021-x. S2CID 257094851. 2018
- Escande, D. F.; Gondret, V.; Sattin, F. (2019). "Relevant heating of the quiet solar corona by Alfvén waves: A result of adiabaticity breakdown". Scientific Reports. 9 (1): 14274. Bibcode:2019NatSR...914274E. doi:10.1038/s41598-019-50820-x. PMC 6776755. PMID 31582798.
- Escande, D. F., & Sattin, F. (2021). Breakdown of adiabatic invariance of fast ions in spherical tokamaks. Nuclear Fusion, 61(10), 106025.
- Escande, D. F., Sattin, F., & Zanca, P. (2022). Plasma-wall self-organization in magnetic fusion. Nuclear Fusion, 62(2), 026001.
- Liu, J., Zhu, P., Escande, D. F., Zhang, J., Xia, D., Wang, Y., ... & J-TEXT Team. (2023). Validation of the plasma-wall self-organization model for density limit in ECRH-assisted start-up of Ohmic discharges on J-TEXT. Nuclear Fusion, 63(9), 096009.
- Escande, D. F., & Momo, B. (2024). Description of magnetic field lines without arcana. Reviews of Modern Plasma Physics, 8(1), 16.
- Liu, J., Zhu, P., Escande, D. F., Liu, W., Xue, S., Lin, X., ... & EAST team. (2026). Accessing the density-free regime with ECRH-assisted ohmic start-up on EAST. Science Advances, 12(1), eadz3040.
