= Ignatios Antoniadis =

Greek physicist (born 1955)

Ignatios Antoniadis (born 2 December 1955 in Chios), is a Greek theoretical physicist, specializing in string theory and particle physics.

== Education and career ==
Antoniadis received in 1977 a degree in mathematics from the University of Athens and in 1978 a Diplôme d'études approfondies (DEA) in theoretical physics from Pierre and Marie Curie University. He received in 1980 his Thèse de troisème cycle (doctorate; thesis title: "Factorisation des singularités de masse et ses applications") from the École normale supérieure and in 1983 his Thèse d'État [higher doctorate; thesis title: Au delà du modèle standard U(1) × SU(2) × SU(3)] from the École polytechnique. (In 1984 the French academic system replaced the Thése d'État with the habilitation.) At Centre national de la recherche scientifique (CNRS), he was from 1982 to 1986 an attaché de recherche at the Centre de physique théorique (CPHT) of the École polytechnique; during those years he was also from 1983 to 1986 a research associate at SLAC. At CNRS, he was from 1986 to 1992 a chargé de recherche and from 1992 to 2015 a directeur de recherche, class 2 and is from 2015 to the present a directeur of recherche, class 1. At CERN in Geneva, Switzerland, he was from 1986 to 1988 a fellow, from 1996 to 1997 a scientific associate, and from 2000 to 2014 a senior staff member. From 1997 to 2009 he was a part-time professeur chargé des cours at the École polytechnique. In 2011 he gave a talk Testing strings at the LHC? at the international symposium on subnuclear physics held in Vatican City. At the Albert Einstein Center of the University of Bern, he was a senior scientist from 2014 to 2020. In 2021, for six months, he held the International Francqui Professorship in Exact Sciences at KU Leuven-Université Libre de Bruxelles (ULB)-Vrije Universiteit Brussel (VUB). He was at the Institute for Advanced Study from February 2023 to May 2023 and from September 2024 to July 2025.

Antoniadis deals with string theory, tests of string theoretical dualities, quantum gravity, supersymmetry, and grand unified theories (GUTs). He played an important role in the development of superstring theory models in four dimensions (fermionic construction). He is particularly known for his investigations into the possible phenomenology of superstring theory (e.g., grand unified theories at low energies; statements about the particle spectrum; possibly observable effects such as extra dimensions; and possible change in gravitational force at short distances).

Antoniadis was awarded in 1995 the Greek Bodossaki Foundation Prize, in 2000 the silver medal of the CNRS, and in 2002 the Special Prize of the Société Française de Physique (SFP). In 1995 the University of Ioannina gave him an honorary doctorate. In 2008 he received an Advanced Grant from the European Research Commission (ERC).

== Selected publications ==
- Antoniadis, I.; Bachas, C.P.; Kounnas, C. (1987). "Four-dimensional superstrings". Nuclear Physics B. 289: 87–108. Bibcode:1987NuPhB.289...87A. doi:10.1016/0550-3213(87)90372-5. 1987 (over 1000 citations)
- ——; Ellis, J.; Hagelin, J.S.; Nanopoulos, D.V. (1987). "Supersymmetric flipped SU(5) revitalized". Physics Letters B. 194 (2): 231–235. Bibcode:1987PhLB..194..231A. doi:10.1016/0370-2693(87)90533-8. 1987 (over 650 citations)
- —— (1990). "A possible new dimension at a few TeV". Physics Letters B. 246 (3–4): 377–384. Bibcode:1990PhLB..246..377A. doi:10.1016/0370-2693(90)90617-F. 1990 (over 2700 citations)
- ——; Benakli, K. (1994). "Limits on extra dimensions in orbifold compactifications of superstrings". Physics Letters B. 326 (1–2): 69–78. arXiv:hep-th/9310151. Bibcode:1994PhLB..326...69A. doi:10.1016/0370-2693(94)91194-0. S2CID 16017137. 1994 (over 450 citations)
- ——; Arkani-Hamed, Nima; Dimopoulos, Savas; Dvali, Gia (1998). "New dimensions at a millimeter to a fermi and superstrings at a TeV". Physics Letters B. 436 (3–4): 257–263. arXiv:hep-ph/9804398. Bibcode:1998PhLB..436..257A. doi:10.1016/S0370-2693(98)00860-0. S2CID 10847839. 1998 (over 5950 citations)
- ——; Ovarlez, Guillaume (1999). "An introduction to perturbative and non-perturbative string theory". arXiv:hep-th/9906108.

== See also ==
- Flipped SU(5)
