= Robert Dautray =

French mathematician (1928–2023)

- Born: Ignace Robert Kouchelevitz; 1 February 1928; Paris, France
- Died: 20 August 2023 (aged 95); Paris, France
- Education: École nationale des arts et métiers École polytechnique
- Scientific career
- Fields: Nuclear energy
- Workplaces: French Alternative Energies and Atomic Energy Commission

Robert Dautray (French pronunciation: [ʁɔbɛʁ dotʁɛ]; 1 February 1928 – 20 August 2023) was a French engineer, scientific director of the French Commissariat à l'Energie Atomique (CEA) and High Commissioner for Atomic Energy. He was a member of the French Academy of Sciences, section mechanical and computer sciences, and of the French Academy of Technology.

== Biography ==
Ignace Robert Kouchelevitz was born on 1 February 1928, in the 10th arrondissement of Paris, France, to a Belarusian father who came to France in 1905 and a Ukrainian mother who came to France in 1902, he escaped the Holocaust during the Second World War.

After the war, he prepared as a free candidate for the entrance exam to the École nationale des arts et métiers. He was awarded the top promotion in the promotion that entered Paris in 1945 (Pa45 promotion). On the advice of his professors, he passed the École polytechnique exam in 1949, where he graduated as a major, then joined the CEA Saclay in the mathematical physics department headed by Jacques Yvon, Jules Horowitz, Albert Messiah, Anatole Abragam, Claude Bloch, and others.

Scientific Director of the CEA, he contributes to the development of atomic applications after scientific work on isotopic regulation and the construction of experimental reactors (Grenoble high flux reactor). He is working on the process of separating uranium isotopes. He is the director of the Phébus large laser program. Robert Dautray was High Commissioner for Atomic Energy from 1993 to 1998.

Robert Dautray recounted his memories, especially his difficult youth, in his book of Memoirs, published in 2007. Chairman of the Scientific Programs Committee of the National Space Center (CNES).

Dautray also addressed the problems of climate change (radiative transfer: greenhouse effect.

Dautray died in Paris on 20 August 2023, at the age of 95.

== Scientific work ==
Almost all of Robert Dautray's professional activity has been devoted to the physical sciences contributing to nuclear energy, both in reactor physics (reactor control and command, breeder reactor physics, Pegasus research reactors, high-flow reactors from the Von Laue Langevin Institute, etc.) and in the physics of reactors.) and upstream of the fuel cycle (control command of the uranium isotope separation plant) as well as downstream of this cycle (formation and physics of plutonium and other actinides isotopes, descendants of fission products, activated structure nuclei, etc.).

In addition, Robert Dautray participated in the establishment of the basic physical sciences for the sciences of high densities and powers of materials and electromagnetic radiation (state equations, opacity, radiative transfer, discontinuities of high velocity flows, interface instabilities, laser implosions, thermonuclear reactions, non-linear neutronics of high velocity media of nuclei making the neutron transport and plasma physics equations non-linear, etc.).

Robert Dautray contributed to the development of the mathematical methods necessary to model these phenomena. Robert Dautray co-chaired with the EDF Studies and Research Department the CEA/EDF digital analysis summer schools.

There was a controversy over the attribution to Dautray of the paternity of the French H-bomb. Experts dispute it, highlighting Michel Carayol's work.

== Selected works ==
Scientific works, co-authored by Dautray, non-exhaustive list:

- Statics and dynamics of nuclear power plants and engines; service of mathematical physics, published by the course qhe RD taught at CEA/Saclay/ INSTN. 1957.
- The Pegasus fuel material test reactor, in collaboration with Pierre Arditti and R. Raievski, CEA Cadarache, United Nations Conference in Geneva, 1960.
- Project for a high neutron flux reactor as part of work with Paul Ageron et al, CEA: 1964
- Project studies for the German French High flux reactor ILL, in collaboration with H. Beckurts. Proceedings Los Alamos and Santa Fe, New Mexico conference, pages 281-310, USA.1966.
- Conference on plasma physics and controlled nuclear fusion, CEA, Limeil, 1984.
- Monte Carlo methods and applications in neutronics, photonics and statistical physics in collaboration with Alcouffe et al. Springer-verlag, Lectures notes in physics, volume 240, 1985.
- The greenhouse effect and its climatic consequences: Chairmanship of the working group of the Academy of Sciences that drafted the report (number 25), 1990.
- Laser/matter interaction work at CEA/Limeil, in collaboration with Berthier et al. IAEA CN/50 Kyoto, 1990
- Civil nuclear energy in the context of climate change. RD report to the Academy of Sciences TEC/DOC Lavoisier; 330 pages, 2001.
- Plutonium isotopes and their descendants by neutron absorption and/or decay. RD Report to the Academy of Sciences, 238 pages, TEC/DOC Lavoisier, 2005.
- Security and hostile use of nuclear energy: from physics to biology. RD report to the Academy of Sciences, 176 pages, TEC/DOC Lavoisier, 2007.
- Energy: towards nuclear breeders installations before the end of the century? In collaboration with J. Friedel. Comptes rendus de l'académie des sciences, Mécanique volume 335, pages 51–74, Elsevier., 2007.
- Supergenerators; the state of materials at high irradiation, high local power and temperature, their gradients and mechanical properties, adapted to the resulting stresses, in collaboration with J. Friedel, CR of the Academy of Sciences, Mechanics, volume 338, pages 649-655, Elsevier, 2010.
- The long term future for civilian nuclear power generation in France. The case for breeder reactors; novelties and issues; CR de l'Académie des sciences, Mécanique; volume 338, pages 369-387, Elsevier, 2011.
- Reflections on the future of nuclear energy, from today's France to tomorrow's world, from the 2nd to the 3rd generation, with J. Friedel and Y. Bréchet, CR of the Academy of Sciences, Physics, 2012, Elsevier.
- Science of nuclear safety post Fukushima; in collaboration with E. Brézin et al. CR Physique, volume13, pages 337-382, Elsevier, 2012.
- Control and limit the dispersion of radioactive products from nuclear power plants in the event of an accident. RD with J. Friedel and Y. Bréchet, CR Physique, volume 15, pages 481-508, Elsevier, 2014.

== Participation in scientific works ==
- "Mathematical analysis and numerical computation for science and technology", in collaboration with JL Lions and his colleagues, CEA/Masson". 4000-page book, first published in three volumes in the CEA collection by Masson, then reissued in eight volumes, CEA INSTN collection published by Eyrolles, and reissued in six volumes in English by Springer; then in paperback by Springer.
- "Probabilistic methods for the equations of physics" with P. L. Lions, R. Sentis, M. Cessenat, G. Ledanois and E. Pardoux, 1989.
- "La fusion thermonucléaire inertielle par laser", with JP Watteau et al, in five volumes CEA Eyrolles collection, 1993.

== Distinctions ==
- Légion d'Honneur: Grand Croix of the Légion d'Honneur (2007);
- Member of the French Academy of Sciences (section of mechanical and computer sciences) since February 7, 1977;
- Laplace Prize of the French Academy of Sciences: 1951
- Lamb Prize of the French Academy of Sciences: 1975
- Nessim Habif Prize for Arts et Métiers (1977)
- Fellow of the Los Alamos Laboratory
- Edward Teller Medal for laser fusion at the Lawrence Livermore National Laboratory (1993)
