= Jean-Philippe Bouchaud =

French physicist (born 1962)

- Born: 1962 (age 63–64); Paris
- Education: École Normale Supérieure
- Known for: Physics of disordered systems, Quantitative modelling of financial markets, Agent Based Models
- Awards: CNRS Silver Medal
- Scientific career
- Fields: Physics, finance
- Workplaces: École Normale Supérieure; Imperial College London
- Doctoral advisor: Claire Lhuillier
- Notable students: Rama Cont, Matthieu Wyart

Jean-Philippe Bouchaud (born 1962) is a French physicist. He is co-founder and chairman of Capital Fund Management (CFM), adjunct professor at École Normale Supérieure and co-director of the CFM-Polytechnique Chair of Econophysics and Complex Systems at Ecole Polytechnique. He is a member of the French Academy of Sciences, and held the Bettencourt Innovation Chair at Collège de France in 2020. In 2026, he was elected to the American Philosophical Society.

== Biography ==
Born in Paris in 1962, Jean-Philippe Bouchaud studied at the French Lycée in London. Graduating from École Normale Supérieure in 1985, he carried out his PhD at the Laboratory of Hertzian Spectroscopy, studying spin-polarized quantum gases with Claire Lhuillier. He then worked for the French National Center for Scientific Research, in particular on liquid Helium 3 and diffusion in random media. He spent a year at the Cavendish Laboratory, University of Cambridge in 1992 before joining the Laboratory of Condensed Matter Physics (SPEC) of the French Atomic Energy and Alternative Energies Commission (Commissariat à l'énergie atomique or CEA) à Saclay. Pioneer in econophysics, he co-founded the company Science et Finance in 1994, which later merged with Capital Fund Management (CFM) in 2000. He is now the Chairman of CFM. After teaching statistical mechanics for ten years at ESPCI, he was appointed in 2009 as an adjunct Professor at École Polytechnique. He now teaches a course From Statistical Mechanics to Social Sciences at École Normale Supérieure and, for a year, at Collège de France. His work covers the physics of disordered and glassy systems, granular materials, the statistics of price formation, stock market fluctuations and the modelling of financial risks. He has repeatedly criticized the dogma of the efficient-market hypothesis and the methodology of economics and mathematical finance, in particular the use of the Black–Scholes model which leads to a systematic underestimation of risk in options trading.

== Awards ==
- IBM Young Researcher Prize in 1989
- CNRS Silver Medal in 1995
- Risk Quant of the Year in 2017
- Elected as member of the French Academy of Sciences in 2017.
- Elected at the chaire Bettencourt de l'innovation at Collège de France in 2020.
- Quant Researcher of the Year, Journal of Portfolio Management in 2024.
- Lars Onsager Prize of the American Physical Society in 2025, together with Leticia Cugliandolo and Jorge Kurchan for their work on the dynamics of glassy systems.

== Bibliography ==
- Jean-Philippe Bouchaud, Antoine Georges 1990 Anomalous diffusion in disordered media: Statistical mechanisms, models and physical application, Physics Reports, Volume 195, Issues 4–5 Pages 127-293
- Lévy Statistics and Laser Cooling: How Rare Events Bring Atoms to Rest by François Bardou, Jean-Philippe Bouchaud, Alain Aspect and Claude Cohen-Tannoudji (Cambridge University Press, 2002)
- Theory of Financial Risk and Derivative Pricing, J-P Bouchaud, M. Potters (Cambridge University Press, 2003)
- Complex Systems, Volume LXXXV: Lecture Notes of the Les Houches Summer School 2006 by Jean-Philippe Bouchaud, Marc Mézard and Jean Dalibard (Elsevier Science, 2007)
- Economics needs a scientific revolution, Jean-Philippe Bouchaud, Nature, 455, 1191 (2008), available here
- Bouchaud, J.-P. (2009). "The (unfortunate) complexity of the economy". Physics World. 22 (4): 28. arXiv:0904.0805. Bibcode:2009PhyW...22d..28B. doi:10.1088/2058-7058/22/04/39.
- How markets slowly digest changes in supply and demand, JP Bouchaud, JD Farmer, F. Lillo in Handbook of financial markets: dynamics and evolution by Thorsten Hens, Klaus Reiner Schenk-Hoppé (North Holland, 2009)
- Endogenous Dynamics of Markets: Price Impact, Feedback Loops and Instabilities, in Lessons from the Financial Crisis Edited by Arthur M. Berd (Risk Books 2010)
- Dynamical Heterogeneities in Glasses, Colloids, and Granular Media (International Series of Monographs on Physics) by Ludovic Berthier, Giulio Biroli, Jean-Philippe Bouchaud and Luca Cipelletti (Oxford University Press, 2011)
- Financial applications of random matrix theory: a short review, Jean-Philippe Bouchaud, Marc Potters, in The Oxford Handbook of Random Matrix Theory Edited by Gernot Akemann, Jinho Baik, and Philippe Di Francesco (Oxford University Press, 2011)
- Bouchaud, Jean-Philippe (2013). "Crises and Collective Socio-Economic Phenomena: Simple Models and Challenges". Journal of Statistical Physics. 151 (3–4): 567–606. arXiv:1209.0453. Bibcode:2013JSP...151..567B. doi:10.1007/s10955-012-0687-3.
- Gualdi, Stanislao; Tarzia, Marco; Zamponi, Francesco; Bouchaud, Jean-Philippe (2015). "Tipping points in macroeconomic Agent-Based models". Journal of Economic Dynamics & Control. 50: 29–61. arXiv:1307.5319. doi:10.1016/j.jedc.2014.08.003.
- Bonart, Julius; Bouchaud, Jean-Philippe; Landier, Augustin; Thesmar, David (2014). "Instabilities in large economies: aggregate volatility without idiosyncratic shocks". J. Stat. Mech. (10) P10040. arXiv:1406.5022. Bibcode:2014JSMTE..10..040B. doi:10.1088/1742-5468/2014/10/P10040.
- Bun, Joel; Bouchaud, Jean-Philippe; Potters, Marc (2017). "Cleaning large correlation matrices: tools from random matrix theory". Physics Reports. 666: 1–109. arXiv:1610.08104. Bibcode:2017PhR...666....1B. doi:10.1016/j.physrep.2016.10.005.
- Trades, Quotes and Prices, Jean-Philippe Bouchaud, Julius Bonart, Jonathan Donier, Martin Gould, Cambridge University Press (2018).
- A First Course in Random Matrix Theory: For Physicists, Engineers and Data Scientists, Marc Potters and Jean-Philippe Bouchaud, Cambridge University Press (2021).
- Bouchaud, Jean-Philippe (2023). "From statistical physics to social sciences: the pitfalls of multi-disciplinarity". Journal of Physics: Complexity. 4 (4): 041001. arXiv:2308.02895. Bibcode:2023JPCom...4d1001B. doi:10.1088/2632-072X/ad104a.
