= Dominique Vautherin =

French physicist (1941–2000)

Dominique Vautherin (October 30, 1941, Bois-Colombes – December 7, 2000, Paris) was a French theoretical physicist, specializing in nuclear physics.

== Education and career ==
Dominique Vautherin studied from 1961 to 1963 at the École polytechnique and then, beginning in 1964, did research for the National Center for Scientific Research (CNRS ). From 1969, he worked at the Université Paris-Sud in Orsay with Marcel Vénéroni (1929–2015) on the Hartree–Fock calculations for a finite range interaction with saturation in closed-shell nuclei. For this work Vautherin received the degree of Doctor of Science with Vénéroni as supervisor. Shortly afterward, Vautherin began his collaboration with David M. Brink on Hartree–Fock calculations with Skyrme interactions for spherical nuclei, and such calculations were then extended to deformed nuclei by Vautherin. Later, with colleagues, he carried out calculations with Skyrme interactions, and such calculations were then extended by Vautherin to deformed kernels. Later, with colleagues, he carried out calculations with Skyrme interactions for giant resonances and nuclear fission.

He was from 1972 to 1974 a visiting scientist at the Massachusetts Institute of Technology (MIT) with John W. Negele and for the academic year 1976–1977 at the University of California at Berkeley. From 1976 to 1991, he was also an associate professor (maître de conférences) at the École polytechnique. For most of his career, he was a professor in the theory division of the Institute of Nuclear Physics at Orsay, and he directed the division from 1991 to 1995. In 1998, he became a professor at the Pierre and Marie Curie University (Paris VI).

In the 1970s, he worked with John W. Negele on the development of a density matrix expansion (local density approximation, LDA) in nuclear structure studies. The density matrix expansion "linked the Skyrme interaction with more conventional two-body forces." He worked extensively with Hubert Flocard on mean field methods and with Nicole Vinh Mau on random phase approximation at finite temperature. Later, Dominique Vautherin also studied neutron star matter (and the transition from nuclear matter to the densities found in neutron stars) in nuclear astrophysics. With Paul Bonche, he studies the equation of state of matter in supernova explosions. Vautherin studied hot nuclei with Paul Bonche and Shimon Levit.

Vautherin collaborated with his former doctoral student Cécile Martin, and with Arthur Kerman and other colleagues, on solutions of Yang-Mills theory using variational methods.

He received in 1975 the Prix Paul Langevin, in 1991 the Grand Prix Jean Richard, and in 2000 the Gay-Lussac-Humboldt Prize. In 1999 he became the chair of the board of directors of the European Centre for Theoretical Studies in Nuclear Physics and Related Areas (ECT*) in Trento, Italy.

== Selected publications ==
- Flocard, H.; Quentin, P.; Kerman, A.K.; Vautherin, D. (1973). "Nuclear deformation energy curves with the constrained Hartree-Fock method". Nuclear Physics A. 203 (3): 433–472. Bibcode:1973NuPhA.203..433F. doi:10.1016/0375-9474(73)90357-6.
- Flocard, H.; Quentin, P.; Vautherin, D.; Veneroni, M.; Kerman, A.K. (1974). "Self-consistent calculation of the fission barrier of ^{240}Pu". Nuclear Physics A. 231 (1): 176–188. Bibcode:1974NuPhA.231..176F. doi:10.1016/0375-9474(74)90300-5.
- Engel, Y.M.; Brink, D.M.; Goeke, K.; Krieger, S.J.; Vautherin, D. (1975). "Time-dependent Hartree-Fock theory with Skyrme's interaction". Nuclear Physics A. 249 (2): 215–238. Bibcode:1975NuPhA.249..215E. doi:10.1016/0375-9474(75)90184-0.
- Bonche, P.; Vautherin, D. (1981). "A mean-field calculation of the equation of state of supernova matter". Nuclear Physics A. 372 (3): 496–526. Bibcode:1981NuPhA.372..496B. doi:10.1016/0375-9474(81)90049-X.
- Bonche, P.; Levit, S.; Vautherin, D. (1984). "Properties of highly excited nuclei". Nuclear Physics A. 427 (2): 278–296. Bibcode:1984NuPhA.427..278B. doi:10.1016/0375-9474(84)90086-1.
- Vautherin, D.; Mau, N.Vinh (1984). "Temperature dependence of collective states in the random-phase approximation". Nuclear Physics A. 422 (1): 140–156. Bibcode:1984NuPhA.422..140V. doi:10.1016/0375-9474(84)90434-2.
- Bonche, P.; Levit, S.; Vautherin, D. (1985). "Statistical properties and stability of hot nuclei". Nuclear Physics A. 436 (2): 265–293. Bibcode:1985NuPhA.436..265B. doi:10.1016/0375-9474(85)90199-X.
- Baym, Gordon; Blaizot, Jean-Paul; Holzmann, Markus; Laloë, Franck; Vautherin, Dominique (1999). "The Transition Temperature of the Dilute Interacting Bose Gas". Physical Review Letters. 83 (9): 1703–1706. arXiv:cond-mat/9905430. Bibcode:1999PhRvL..83.1703B. doi:10.1103/PhysRevLett.83.1703. S2CID 16637674.
