= Omar Hurricane =

Physicist

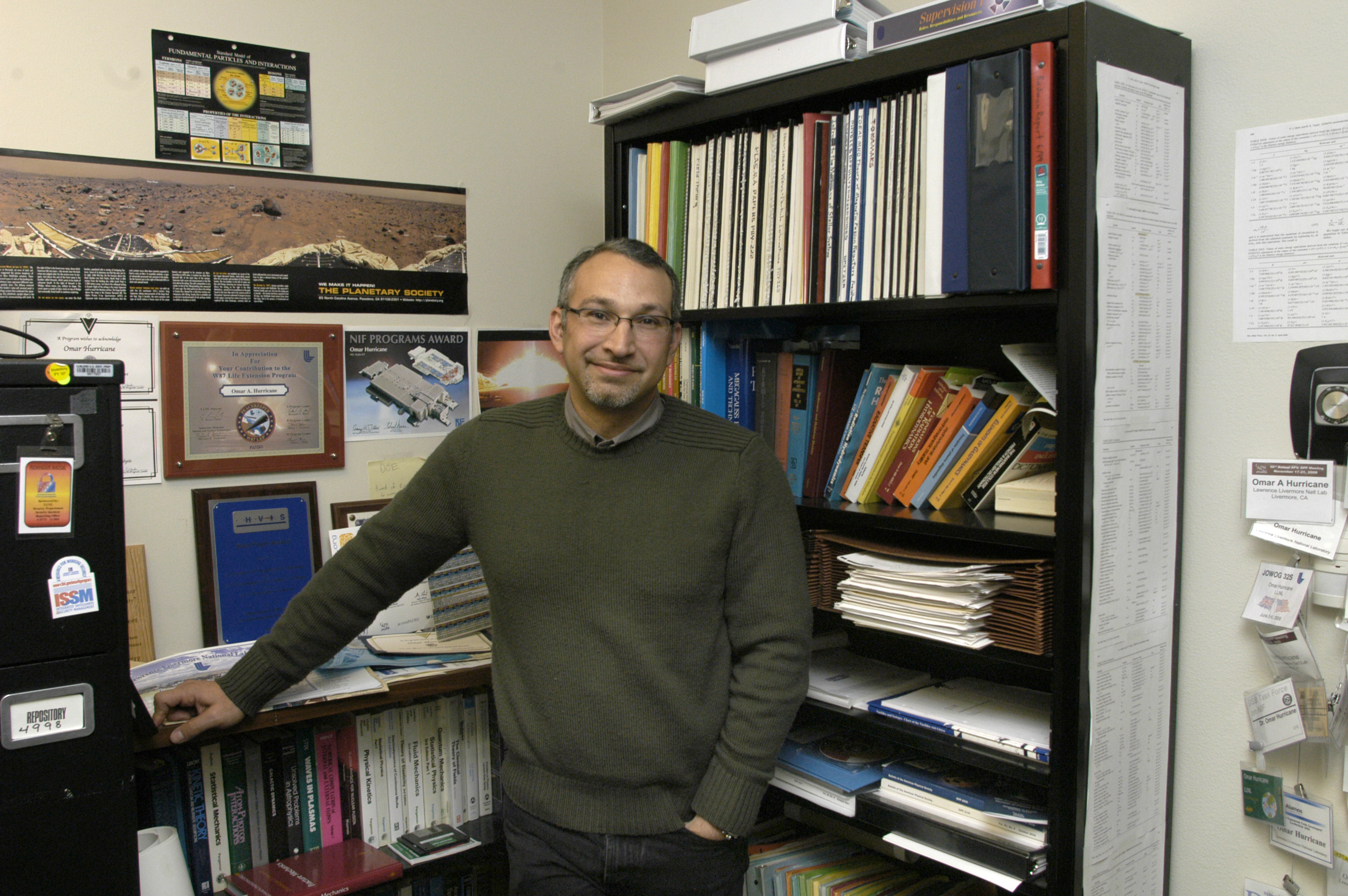
Omar Hurricane

Omar Hurricane is a physicist at Lawrence Livermore National Laboratory, in the thermonuclear and inertial confinement fusion design division. Hurricane completed his Ph.D. at the University of California, Los Angeles (UCLA) under the supervision of Professor René Pellat in 1994. He remained at UCLA as a postdoc under adviser Steven Cowley (now Director of PPPL), studying the kink and nonlinear ballooning mode instability in high-beta plasmas until joining LLNL in 1998 as a designer in A-Division (Secondary Design).

Hurricane initially worked on modeling underground tests then in the Phoenix pulsed power project and as the W87 secondary lead designer during its first life extension program (LEP). Hurricane led a 10-year interdisciplinary science effort, euphemistically called “Energy Balance,” that resolved a long-standing nuclear weapons issue for which he was awarded the U.S. Department of Energy Ernest Orlando Lawrence Award in 2009 .

In 2012, Hurricane was asked by then-Lab director Parney Albright to lead an alternative ignition science team. Under Hurricane’s leadership, this effort was broken into two parts: focused physics experiments to study questions that had arisen from NIF experiments and integrated experiments using an alternate capsule design that traded off theoretical high performance for actual improved robustness and predictability. Both tracks and the underlying ‘basecamp’ strategy have been extremely successful, forming the basis for the National Ignition Facility (NIF) obtaining fusion ignition and have led to improved understanding in ignition physics.

== Education ==
Hurricane attained his B.S. in Physics and Applied Math from Metropolitan State University of Denver in 1990. He graduated with an MS in physics from University of California, Los Angeles in 1992, and gained his PhD from UCLA as well in 1994.

== Career ==
Following numerous internships, Hurricane began his professional career as a postdoctoral fellow at UCLA. He then went on to become the senior scientist at UCLA's Institute of Plasma Fusion and research. He has been Chief Scientist for the inertial confinement fusion program at the Lawrence Livermore National Laboratory since 2014.

He has published widely in journals and conference papers. Hurricane was the lead author of a 2014 paper presenting the results of fusion experiments demonstrating Fuel Gain greater than unity, which is the first laboratory demonstration where the fusion energy output exceeded the energy injected into the fusion fuel. He received the Edward Teller Award in 2021 for “Visionary scientific insights and leadership of National Ignition Facility (NIF) experiments resulting in the achievement of fuel gain, an alpha-heating-dominated plasma, and a burning plasma.”
