= Heinrich Hora =

German-Australian theoretical physicist (born 1931)

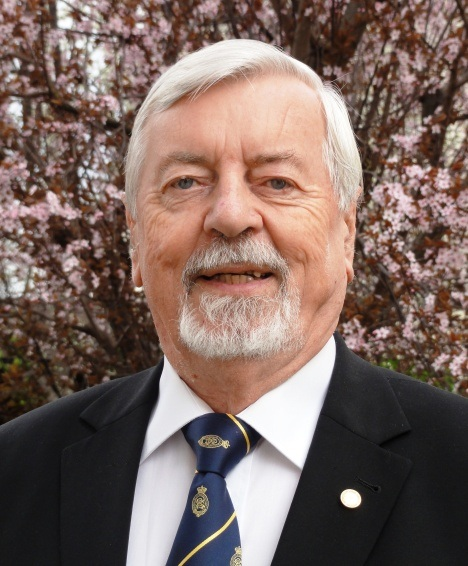
- Heinrich Hora in 2012
- Born: 1 July 1931 (age 95); Podmokly, Czechoslovakia
- Education: University of Halle-Wittenberg; University of Jena
- Spouse: Rosemarie Hora † 2007
- Awards: Edward Teller Award (1991); UNSW Dirac Medal (2001)
- Scientific career
- Fields: Theoretical physics
- Workplaces: University of New South Wales

Heinrich Hora (born 1 July 1931) is a German-Australian theoretical physicist. He made contributions to solid state physics, optical properties of plasma with relativistic and quantum effects and nonlinear dynamics with applications of lasers for producing nuclear fusion energy. He lives in Sydney where he is an emeritus professor at the University of New South Wales and a former vice-president of the Royal Society of New South Wales.

== Early life ==
Heinrich Hora was born on 1 July 1931 in Podmokly, Czechoslovakia. He received the degree Diplom-Physiker from the Martin-Luther-University, Halle-Wittenberg, Germany, in 1956, and the Dr. Rer Nat. from the Friedrich-Schiller-University, Jena, Germany. In 1981 the University of New South Wales, Australia, awarded him the D.Sc. degree.

== Academic career and achievements ==
As foundation professor of theoretical physics at the University of New South Wales from 1975 and emeritus from 1992 he established the Department of Theoretical Physics, where a number of students received the university medal, with a record level of publications and where he supervised most of his 25 PhD students. Guest and adjunct professorships include ones at the Rensselaer Polytechnic Institute, the universities of Rochester, Bern, Iowa, Giessen, Tokyo, Regensburg, Osaka, Western Sydney and the Weizmann Institute. For seven years he was active in industrial research at Zeiss, IBM, Westinghouse and Siemens. He also was involved with research for 12 years at the Max-Planck-Institute for Plasma Physics in Garching near Munich, Germany and for one year as attache remun. at CERN (Conseil Européen pour la Recherche Nucléaire, or European Council for Nuclear Research) in Geneva, Switzerland.

He consulted Rainer Erler to the laser movie "Der Verräter" in the TV series "Das Blaue Palais". His taped lecture course at CERN (1991) about laser acceleration of particles contributed to Gerard Mourou's PeV particle acceleration.

His discoveries include the volume mechanism for photo-electric emission, sub-threshold defect generation by electron beams for producing semiconductor junctions with application in solar cells. Prof. Hora's first publication about growth of diamond crystals by physical vapour deposition became an IBM patent in 1964. His first general formula for nuclear energy gain at laser compression and thermal ignition of fusion led to his subsequent discovery of volume ignition (later confirmed by John Archibald Wheeler as "Wheeler modes"). Against established knowledge, he discovered electron acceleration in vacuum by lasers based on nonlinearity. His derivation of the nonlinear (ponderomotive) forces of laser-plasma interaction including dielectric effects in the Maxwellian stress tensor led to the prediction of ultrahigh acceleration of plasma blocks being confirmed experimentally by Sauerbrey with application to a new laser fusion energy scheme as block ignition of uncompressed fuel resulting in a possible nuclear energy production with less radioactivity than burning coal. He discovered the general mechanism of ponderomotive and relativistic self-focusing. His theory for crossing electron and laser beams within media (Schwarz-Hora effect) led to the discovery of the correspondence principle of electromagnetic interaction and following Nathan Rosen to nonlocality and quantum entangling. Based on the importance of including usually neglected very tiny quantities as the longitudinal field components of laser beams led to the formulation of the nonlinearity principle showing how nonlinear physics is changing from wrong linear physics into correct understanding.

Hora initiated advanced schemes of laser driven fusion energy and became Director of the foundation of SAFE (Society to Advance Fusion Energy) with the president Luella LaMeer Slaner from the traditional billionaires North of Manhattan and George H. Miley as executive director, to push through a law for spending $20 billion for nuclear fusion research finally signed by President Jimmy Carter in 1980. This led finally to the scheme of laser pulses of 30 kilojoule energy to produce gigajoule energy from the clean reaction of uncompressed proton-boron fuel resulting in less radioactivity than burning coal.

By 2017 he and associated startup HB11 had committed to hydrogen-boron fusion and in February 2020 announced patents on the technique using a petawatt laser.

== Family and personal life ==
Heinrich Hora and his late wife Rosemarie Hora † 2007, née Weiler, have six children, sixteen grandchildren and six great-grandchildren.

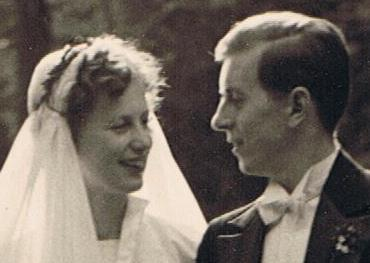
Heinrich Hora's marriage in 1956

== Degrees and awards ==
D. Sc. (UNSW), Dr. rer. nat. (Jena), Dipl. Physiker (Halle-Wittenberg), FAIP, FInstP (London), FRSN

Ritter-von-Gerstner Medal (1985) Edward-Teller Medal (1991) Dirac Medal of the University of New South Wales (2001) Ernst-Mach Medal (2002)

== Books ==
=== Editor ===
- Founder and editor-in-chief of "Laser and Particle Beams", Cambridge University Press (1982–1991)
- Co-editor of P.A.M. Dirac "Direction of Physics", Wiley, New York 1978 (also Russian and Japanese)
- Co-editor of "Edward Teller Lectures", Imperial College London 2005
- Founder and co-editor of Conference Series "Laser Interaction and Related Plasma Phenomena", Plenum Press New York, 12 volumes 1971–1992

=== Author ===
- H. Hora. Laser Plasmas and Nuclear Energy. Plenum, New York, 1975, 464 pages. ISBN 0-306-30785-5
- H. Hora. Nonlinear Plasma Dynamics. Springer, Heidelberg 1979, 250 pages. ISBN 3-540-09502-0
- H. Hora. Physics of Laser-Driven Plasmas. Wiley, New York 1981, 334 pages (also in Russian). ISBN 0-471-07880-8
- S. Eliezer, A.K. Ghatak, and H. Hora (foreword by Edward Teller). Introduction to the Equations of State. Cambridge University Press, Cambridge, 1986, 378 pages. ISBN 0-521-30389-3.
- H. Hora. Plasmas at High Temperature and Density. Springer, Heidelberg 1991, 456 pages. ISBN 3-540-54312-0, 2nd edition paperback, S. Roderer, Regensburg 2000, ISBN 3-89783-156-2
- H. Hora. Elektrodynamik. S. Roderer, Regensburg, 1994, 192 pages, ISBN 3-89073-749-8.
- H. Hora. Nonlinear Force and Pondermotion. ILE Osaka 1996, 208 pages ISBN 4-9900502-1-5.
- H. Hora. Innovation, Technologie & Ökonomie. S. Roderer, Regensburg 1998, 248p. ISBN 3-89073-230-5 (2nd edition 2000)
- H. Hora. Laser Plasma Physics – Forces and the Nonlinearity Principle. Spie Press 2000, Bellingham, WA, 232p. ISBN 0-8194-3509-0
- H. Hora. Laser Plasma Physics – Forces and the Nonlinearity Principle. Spie Press 2016, Bellingham, WA, 350p. ISBN 9781628412956
- S. Eliezer, A.K. Ghatak, and H. Hora. Fundamentals of Equations of State. World Scientific Publishing, Singapore 2002, 385p. ISBN 981-02-4833-4
- Heinrich Hora. Keine Klimakatstrophe – es ist viel schlimmer (No Climatic Catastrophe – it is much worse) 202 pages, Sydney 2007, ISBN 978-0-9803575-0-9 same: Klimakatastrophe Überwinden. Roderer-Verlag, Regensburg 2007, 202 pages ISBN 978-3-89783-587-0
- Heinrich Hora Klimaprobleme – Lösungwege, S. Roderer-Verlag, Regensburg 2010, 256 pages, ISBN 978-3-89783-715-7

== See also ==
- Aneutronic fusion
