= Capital Fund Management =

French hedge fund

- Industry: Investment Management
- Founded: 1991; 35 years ago
- Headquarters: Paris, France
- Key people: Jean-Philippe Bouchaud
- AUM: $29 billion (as of April 2026)
- Number of employees: c. 350 (as of Aug 2024)
- Website: www.cfm.com

Capital Fund Management (CFM) is a global asset management company based in Paris with staff in New York City and London. CFM takes a scientific and academic approach to finance, using quantitative and systematic techniques to develop alternative investment strategies and products for institutional investors and financial advisers. CFM has approx. 350 employees worldwide and manages $29 billion as of April 2026.

== History ==
Founded in 1991 by Jean-Pierre Aguilar and Bruno Combier, CFM merged in 2000 with Science & Finance, a company founded in 1994 by Jean-Philippe Bouchaud as the research arm of CFM and an early pioneer in quantitative and systematic investment strategies. CFM's longest running programs use a multi-strategy, multi-asset approach to investing. In 2013 CFM broadened its offering with a range of alternative beta programs applying quantitative and systematic techniques to well-documented alternative investment strategies.

== People ==
Since the death of Jean-Pierre Aguilar in July 2009 the company has been managed by Jean-Philippe Bouchaud, Philippe Jordan, Marc Potters and Jacques Saulière. Laurent Laloux joined the board in 2017.

== Links with academia ==
CFM maintains strong links with academia. Jean-Philippe Bouchaud maintains a position as Professor of Physics at École Polytechnique and is a member of the French Academy of Sciences.

=== Partnership with Imperial College ===
The CFM-Imperial Institute of Quantitative Finance was established in 2014 through a partnership between Imperial College's Mathematical Finance Group and CFM, with the objective of promoting interdisciplinary research focusing on understanding financial market complexity, quantitative modelling and the management of financial risks.

=== Partnership with École normale supérieure (ENS) ===
In 2016, CFM announced that, through the CFM Foundation for Research, they had funded a new research chair in Modelling and Data Science at the École normale supérieure (ENS) in Paris. The aim is to provide ongoing support to the academic community to conduct research into data science techniques across a range of disciplines. Therefore this research chair is focused on a multidisciplinary approach to data science and modelling, and works in collaboration with the departments of biology, economics, computer science, geophysics, physics, cognitive sciences and humanities.

=== Partnership with École Polytechnique ===
This collaboration with École Polytechnique was established in 2019, and seeks to apply scientific techniques to further our understanding of the fundamental problems faced in financial markets. This econophysics initiative encourages participants to take a different approach to economic modelling and gives them the platform and means to challenge the academic orthodoxy, which underpins policymakers' approach to managing economies.

=== Alternative Data initiative with Columbia University’s Program for Economic Research ===
In 2019 Columbia University’s Program for Economic Research and CFM launched an initiative to explore and analyse how alternative data can be used to further the understanding of financial markets, improve economic forecasting and enhance investment strategies.

=== CFM Foundation for Research ===
In 2009 CFM created the CFM Foundation for Research to support the academic community by making direct contributions to research projects in a broad range of disciplines beyond the company's core focus of investment management. The Foundation provides scholarships for PhD research projects, assists in the publication of academic papers, and helps with the organisation of symposiums.
