= Journal of Russian Laser Research =

Scientific journal on laser science

- Discipline: Laser science, quantum electronics
- Language: English
- Edited by: Sergey Yu. Savinov

Publication details
- Former name: Journal of Soviet Laser Research
- History: 1980–present
- Publisher: Springer
- Frequency: Bimonthly
- Impact factor: 0.8 (2024)

Standard abbreviations
- ISO 4: J. Russ. Laser Res.

Indexing
- CODEN: JRLREO
- ISSN: 1071-2836 (print); 1573-8760 (web)

Links
- Journal homepage; Online access; Online archive

Journal of Russian Laser Research is a peer-reviewed scientific journal published bimonthly by Springer. Established in 1980 under the name Journal of Soviet Laser Research, it covers fundamental and applied research in laser science. Its founding and current editor-in-chief are Nikolay Basov and Sergey Yu. Savinov (Lebedev Physical Institute), respectively.

== Abstracting and indexing ==
The journal is abstracted and indexed in:

- Current Contents/Electronics & Telecommunications Collection
- EBSCO databases
- Ei Compendex
- Inspec
- ProQuest databases
- Science Citation Index Expanded
- Scopus

According to the Journal Citation Reports, the journal has a 2024 impact factor of 0.8.
