= John M. Dawson =

American physicist

John Myrick Dawson
- Born: September 30, 1930; Champaign, Illinois
- Died: November 17, 2001 (aged 71); Los Angeles, California
- Education: University of Maryland, College Park (B.S., Ph.D.)
- Known for: Computational physics Plasma acceleration
- Awards: James Clerk Maxwell Prize for Plasma Physics (1977); Aneesur Rahman Prize (1994)
- Scientific career
- Fields: Plasma physics
- Thesis: Distortion of Atoms and Molecules in Dense Media (1957)
- Doctoral advisor: Zaka Slawsky
- Doctoral students: John Lindl; Warren B. Mori

John Myrick Dawson (30 September 1930 in Champaign, Illinois – 17 November 2001 in Los Angeles) was an American computational physicist and the father of plasma-based acceleration techniques. Dawson earned his degrees in physics from the University of Maryland, College Park: a B.S. in 1952 and Ph.D. in 1957. His thesis "Distortion of Atoms and Molecules in Dense Media" was prepared under the guidance of Zaka Slawsky.

On graduation, John joined the Princeton Plasma Physics Laboratory (a.k.a. Project Matterhorn). Initially a research physicist, he rose to head the theoretical group from 1966 to 1973. He also spent two years (1969–71) at the Naval Research Laboratory in Washington, D.C., where he started a plasma simulation group. He then joined UCLA in 1973 as a professor of physics. He served as director of UCLA's Center for Plasma Physics and Fusion Engineering from 1976 to 1987. He was associate director of the Institute for Plasma and Fusion Research from 1989 to 1991, principal scientist with the institute since 1989 and the institute's interim director.

John was a leading figure in the plasma physics community for more than four decades, with his contributions to science spanning all of plasma physics. He performed seminal work on magnetic fusion, inertial confinement fusion, space plasmas, plasma astrophysics, free-electron lasers, and basic plasma physics. He also proposed numerous controlled-fusion concepts. A visionary, he realized as early as the late 1950s the potential impact of simulations as a way to test both theories and large construction projects before they were built. He used simulations in 1959 to answer such fundamental questions as how large can a plasma wave become before breaking. During the late 1970s and 1980s, John was using simulations to test out new ideas such as plasma-based acceleration. By the 1990s, he was realizing his broader vision for simulations in such projects as the Numerical Tokamak.

In the late 1970s and 1980s, while at UCLA, John pioneered the field of plasma-based acceleration. He proposed letting particles surf on the plasma-wave wakes left behind by a laser or a particle beam as it moved through plasma. The fields in these wakes can be more than 1000 times higher than in conventional accelerators.

A true humanitarian, Dawson believed that science was still the most noble of professions. He believed strongly in the importance of controlled nuclear-fusion research and was particularly proud of his invention of an isotope separation process that was used to detect cancer and, consequently, help save many lives. John had successfully overcome life-threatening illnesses several times. Shortly before his death, he had been in improving health and had enjoyed attending APS's division of plasma physics meeting in Long Beach, California.

== Honours and awards ==
Dawson received the James Clerk Maxwell Prize for Plasma Physics in 1977 and the Aneesur Rahman Prize for Computational Physics in 1994; both are the highest honors bestowed by the American Physical Society's plasma physics and computational physics divisions, respectively. He was named California Scientist of the Year by the California Science Center in 1978. The Rahman prize is the highest honor given by the American Physical Society for work in computational physics. He was a member of the National Academy of Sciences, and a recipient of the California Scientist of the Year award, a Fulbright Fellowship, and two UCLA physics teaching awards.

James Clerk Maxwell Prize for Plasma Physics (1977) citation
"For his outstanding contributions to plasma physics and controlled fusion as both as innovative theorist and a prolific inventor, whose ideas have provided the basis for several current fusion configurations. He initiated the use of computer simulation as a new and powerful tool for the study of plasmas. He inspired and trained a cadre of younger theorists to continue the development of the field he initiated."

Aneesur Rahman Prize (1994) citation
"In recognition of his leading role in opening the field of computer simulation of plasmas and for numerous major contributions made using plasma simulation as a complement to analytic theory and experiment. He has led in opening the field of plasma-based accelerators and made major advances in understanding basic nonlinear plasma wave processes, anomalous absorption and transport, advanced plasma-based coherent light sources and space plasma phenomena."

In 2007, the American Physical Society renamed its Award for Excellence in Plasma Physics in honor of John Dawson.
