= Ed Moses (physicist) =

American physicist

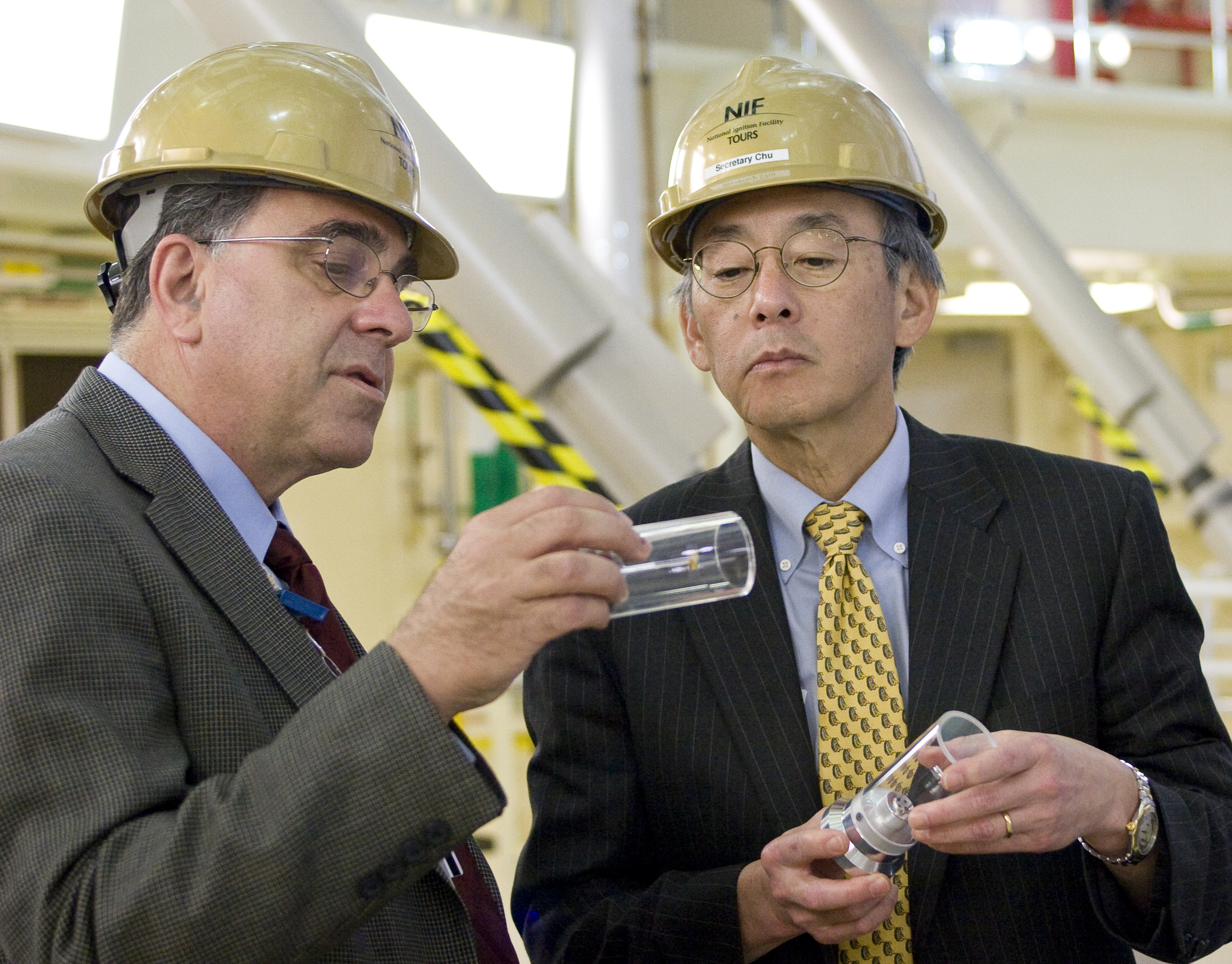
Ed Moses (left) shows a model of an ignition target to U.S. Department of Energy Secretary Steven Chu.

Edward I. Moses is an American engineer, technologist, technology executive, and major project manager, whose career has focused on high-power laser systems, inertial confinement fusion, large-scale scientific facilities, and the commercialization of advanced technologies. He is the founder and chief executive officer of Longview Fusion Energy Systems. He is the former president of the Giant Magellan Telescope Organization. He is a past principal associate director for the National Ignition Facility & Photon Science Directorate, where he led the California-based National Ignition Facility (NIF), the largest experimental science facility in the US and the world's most energetic laser.

== Education ==
Moses received his undergraduate degree from Cornell University, where he also earned a Ph.D. focused on quantum electronics and laser science. During his career he has also held academic appointments, including positions at the University of California, Berkeley, and the Harvard–Smithsonian Center for Astrophysics.

== Career ==
=== Lawrence Livermore National Laboratory ===
Moses spent much of his professional career at Lawrence Livermore National Laboratory (LLNL), where he held scientific, engineering, and executive management positions involving laser technology, plasma physics, isotope separation, and large-scale engineering programs. He also lead and advised significant efforts in radiation treatment of cancer, fundamental physics, material science, and complex systems engineering and modeling.

Moses has 33 years of experience developing Department of Energy/National Nuclear Security Administration (DOE/NNSA) laser systems and 35 years of experience developing and managing complex laser systems and high-technology projects. He also has experience with the Departments of Defense, State, Homeland Security, and Congress.

He directed the Atomic Vapor Laser Isotope Separation (AVLIS) Program, which developed high-average-power visible laser systems for uranium, and other strategic materials isotope separation. The program was among the largest technology transfer efforts undertaken by the U.S. Department of Energy during its commercialization phase.

Moses also directed development of the Peregrine Cancer Treatment System, a radiation treatment planning and optimization technology that advanced through U.S. Food and Drug Administration approval and commercial deployment. The system became part of clinical radiation oncology practice and represented an example of technology transfer from a U.S. national laboratory to the medical device industry.

=== National Ignition Facility ===
In 2000, Moses was appointed project manager for the National Ignition Facility (NIF) and then in 2005 as Principal Associate Director for NIF and Photon Science at Lawrence Livermore National Laboratory as well as Director of the National Ignition Facility. During his tenure, the approximately $5 billion facility completed construction, commissioning, and scientific activation. NIF met or exceeded its principal technical performance objectives and became the world's highest-energy laser facility for inertial confinement fusion and high-energy-density physics research. The National Ignition Facility management team received the Project Management Institute's Project of the Year Award in recognition of the execution of the project. Under Moses's leadership, the facility achieved a series of experimental milestones in frontier science, strategic security, and fusion, culminating later in the demonstration of fusion ignition and target gain, providing experimental validation of decades of inertial confinement fusion research. This is the only facility that has reached this milestone.

=== Giant Magellan Telescope ===
Following his work at LLNL, Moses became President of the Giant Magellan Telescope Organization (GMTO), an international consortium responsible for developing the Giant Magellan Telescope. The GMTO is a leader in the new class of 30-meter telescopes being developed today. His responsibilities included strategic planning, engineering management, governance, financing, and coordination among partner institutions in North America, South America, Australia, and South Korea supporting development of the observatory.

=== Longview Fusion Energy Systems ===
Moses is the founder and chief executive officer of Longview Fusion Energy Systems, a company developing laser-driven fusion energy systems for commercial electric power generation. The company focuses on engineering and commercializing 1000 MWe laser-driven fusion power plants through the integration of laser systems, target technology, fuel-cycle systems, power conversion systems, and utility-scale plant design. Its development activities include collaborations with Fluor and other engineering firms, utilities, and national laboratories.

=== Other activities ===
Moses founded Advanced Technology Applications, a consulting company serving government laboratories and private industry, and later founded Longview Consulting, which advises organizations on technology development, engineering management, commercialization, and large-scale project execution.

Throughout his career he has served as an advisor to government agencies, national and international laboratories, universities, and private companies on scientific, engineering, and technology commercialization issues.

=== Research ===
Moses has authored more than 150 scientific publications and is an inventor or co-inventor on 25 patents in laser science, optics, plasma physics, fusion energy, radiation therapy, and engineering systems.

His research interests include inertial confinement fusion, high-power laser systems, systems engineering, technology commercialization, and the management of large multidisciplinary scientific programs.

=== Honors and recognition ===
Moses was elected to the National Academy of Engineering for contributions to high-energy laser systems and the management of large scientific facilities. He is a Fellow of the American Association for the Advancement of Science, Optica (formerly the Optical Society of America), SPIE, and the Hagler Institute for Advanced Study.

His honors include the Edward Teller Medal, the Fusion Power Associates Leadership Award, the D. S. Rozhdestvensky Medal, an R&D 100 Award, the Jefferson Award for Public Service, and several awards recognizing achievements in engineering and project management. He has won numerous awards, including the 2003 NNSA Award of Excellence for Significant Contribution to Stockpile Stewardship, the 2004 DOE Award of Excellence for the first joint LLNL/Los Alamos National Laboratory experiments on NIF, and the D.S. Rozhdestvensky Medal for Outstanding Contributions to Lasers and Optical Sciences. He holds seven patents in laser technology and computational physics.
