= Hye-Sook Park =

South Korean and American physicist

- 박혜숙
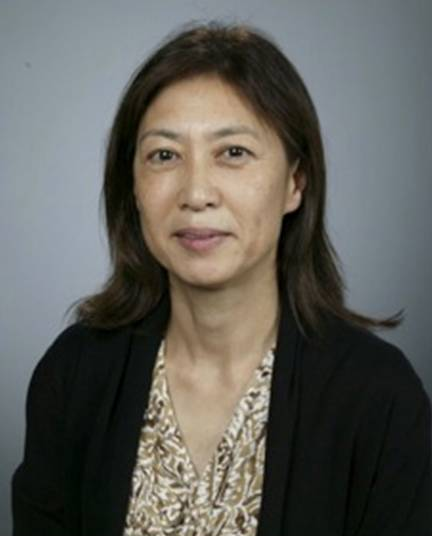
- Park in 2013
- Born: South Korea
- Citizenship: South Korean, American
- Known for: Laser-based plasma physics, astrophysical collisionless shocks, National Ignition Facility experiments
- Awards: Fellow of the American Physical Society (2010); Lev D. Landau and Lyman Spitzer Jr. Award (2024); Edward Teller Medal (2025)

Hye-Sook Park (Korean: 박혜숙) is a South Korean and American physicist whose research has included the development of digital cameras for applications in national security and astrophysics, and the laser-based study of plasma. She is a scientist at the Lawrence Livermore National Laboratory, associated there with the National Ignition Facility.

== Education and career ==
Park is originally from South Korea, born there to a poor family at a time when the country was still struggling to recover from the Korean War. She started her post-secondary education at age 21, at a small private United Methodist university in the US, Pfeiffer University, on a full scholarship, as the first student there from Asia. After getting through the entire undergraduate program in a single year, she continued her studies in physics at the graduate level at the University of Michigan. Her work there involves the search for proton decay at the IMB Proton Lifetime experiment. She finished her Ph.D. in 1985, two years before the experiment's successful detection of neutrinos from supernova SN 1987A.

She joined the Lawrence Livermore National Laboratory after postdoctoral research at the University of California, Berkeley developing instrumentation for high-energy physics experiments. Her first work at the laboratory involved the development of a wide-angle digital camera intended for the Strategic Defense Initiative. Her camera work from this time was also incorporated into the Clementine spacecraft, sent to the Moon to map its polar regions, and into a project that studied gamma-ray bursts and helped identify their extra-galactic origin.

Her interests shifted to laser-based plasma physics in 2003. Her research in this area has included the use of high-powered lasers to generate experimental models of the collisionless shock waves in astrophysical plasma streams, the study of the magnetic fields generated by turbulent plasma flows, and the use of mechanical confinement to stabilize plasma.

== Recognition ==
Park was named as a Fellow of the American Physical Society (APS), in the 2010 class of fellows, after a nomination from the APS Division of Plasma Physics, "for development of seminal experimental techniques to create and probe plasmas with extreme density and temperature".

She was a 2024 recipient of the Lev D. Landau and Lyman Spitzer Jr. Award for Outstanding Contributions to Plasma Physics, given jointly by the APS and the European Physical Society, as part of a team of four scientists honored for "critical advancement in the understanding of the particle acceleration physics in astrophysically relevant shocks through theoretical analysis and experiments at the National Ignition Facility".

In 2025 she was awarded the Edward Teller Medal by the American Nuclear Society "for her pioneering high-energy density experimental work in high pressure materials science, inertial confinement fusion, and astrophysical collisionless shock generation, the resulting particle acceleration, and magnetic field generation."
