= Yves Ayant =

French theoretical physicist and professor

- Born: January 6, 1926; Ollioules, France
- Died: June 8, 2016 (aged 90); Grenoble, France
- Awards: Paul Langevin Prize

Academic background
- Education: École normale supérieure (Paris)
- Thesis: Contribution à l'étude des formes et largeurs de raies dans les résonances nucléaires

Academic work
- Discipline: physics
- Sub-discipline: theoretical physics
- Institutions: University of Grenoble
- Main interests: magnetism

Yves Ayant (January 6, 1926 – June 8, 2016) was a French theoretical physicist and professor of at the University of Grenoble. Ayant received the first Paul Langevin Prize in 1957 and his books have been used as teaching texts in several universities, and been translated for use as textbooks.

== Education ==
Ayant studied at the École normale supérieure (Paris) from 1946 and received his doctorate from the Sorbonne in 1954 with a dissertation on nuclear physics entitled Contribution à l'étude des formes et largeurs de raies dans les résonances nucléaires. To obtain the agrégation, in 1950 Yves Ayant started working in the team led by Pierre Grivet on a thesis, and in 1954, a jury with Alfred Kastler and Louis Néel defended the dissertation.

== Teaching ==
Ayant was Professor of theoretical and advanced physics at the Grenoble Faculty of Science (1961–1970), then at the Grenoble 1 Scientific and Medical University (1971–1994). He was the first to teach quantum mechanics in Grenoble, in a course for researchers followed by many colleagues. He also taught, at various levels, statistical physics and numerical analysis, in particular group theory. He supervised several thesis students at both the university and the Grenoble Nuclear Research Center (CENG).

== Academic work ==
As a theoretical physicist, Ayant dealt with magnetism, nuclear magnetic resonance, electron spin resonance and nuclear quadrupole resonance, that corresponded to the experimental orientation of the University of Grenoble under Louis Néel as a center of magnetism research in France, interpreting the paramagnetic susceptibility behavior of rare-earth gallates and developing crystal field effects in solids and their applications to electron paramagnetic resonance (EPR). Ayant was the "in-house theorist" at the Laboratoire de Spectrométrie Physique (now Laboratoire Interdisciplinaire de Physique, LIPhy) headed by Michel Soutif, whose aim was to study matter using a broad repertoire of spectroscopic techniques. Ayant then published two fundamental papers on relaxation phenomena in liquid nuclear magnetic resonance (NMR). In addition, he often received numerous researchers, including chemists, who came to him for help in interpreting their experimental results.

Ayant also worked as a consultant at the (CENG) of the French Atomic Energy Commission, where he contributed to the development of NMR magnetometers for measuring magnetic fields of the order of magnitude of the earth's field.

Ayant was particularly interested in the shapes and displacements of lines, which led him to introduce the notion of a correlation function of a quantum variable, whose main properties he established simultaneously with the Japanese physicist Ryogo Kubo, but independently. This notion transcended its application to (NMR) and was taken up in numerous theories of dynamical effects. According to Élie Belorizki and Pierre Aberbuch, Yves Ayant published his work in the Journal de Physique, in French, while Kubo did so in English, which explains why the latter is more often cited.

== Awards ==
- Ayant received the first Paul Langevin Prize in 1957.

== Works ==
=== Thesis ===
- Ayant, Yves (1955). Contribution à l'étude des formes et largeurs de raies dans les résonances nucléaires (Thesis) (in French). OCLC 33272554.

=== Books ===
- ————— (1956). Electronique théorique. ENSEHRG.
- —————; Belorizky, Élie (1969). Cours de mécanique quantique: maîtrise de physique (in French).
- —————; Abragam, A.; Bleaney, B. (1971). Résonance paramagnétique électronique des ions de transition (in French).
- —————; Borg, Marcel (1971). Fonctions spéciales à l'usage des étudiants en physique. Maîtrise de physique (in French). Paris: Dunod.
  - —————; Borg, Marcel (1974). Funciones especiales (in Spanish). Translated by Carcedo, A. Madrid: Alhambra. ISBN 84-205-0504-8.
- ————— (1992). Fonctions hypergéométriques, fonctions elliptiques et fractions continues. Collection Grenoble sciences. Université Joseph Fourier. ISBN 978-2-908019-17-9.
- —————; Belorizky, Élie (1995). Cours de mathématiques pour la physique. Collection Grenoble sciences (in French). Université Joseph Fourier. ISBN 978-2-908019-43-8.
- —————; Belorizky, Élie (2000-05-10). Mécanique quantique. Avec exercices et problemes résouls. Sciences Sup. (in French) (3rd ed.). Dunod. ISBN 978-2-10-004742-0.
- —————; Belorizky, Élie (2007). Mécanique quantique. Cours avec 87 exercices corrigés. Sciences Sup. Cours et exercices corrigés - Master - Ecoles d'ingénieur (in French) (3rd ed.). Dunod. ISBN 978-2-10-051019-1.

=== Articles ===
- ————— (1956). "La théorie des temps de relaxation en résonance quadrupolaire". Journal de Physique et le Radium. 17 (4): 338–342. doi:10.1051/jphysrad:01956001704033800.
