= Peter Norreys =

Professor of inertial fusion science

Peter Norreys is professor of inertial fusion science at the University of Oxford and is an Individual Merit Fellow of the Science and Technology Facilities Council.

In 2013 Norreys won the Institute of Physics Cecilia Payne-Gaposchkin Medal and Prize.
