= Christine Labaune =

French physicist

Christine Garban-Labaune
- Education: École Polytechnique
- Occupation: plasma physicist
- Known for: Inertial confinement fusion research

Christine Garban-Labaune is a French plasma physicist known for her research in inertial confinement fusion.

== Education and career ==
After earning a doctorate from the École Polytechnique in 1982, Labaune became the head of the Interaction Laser-Plasma research team in the laboratory for the use of intense lasers at the École Polytechnique in 1984. She is a director of research in the French National Centre for Scientific Research.

== Recognition ==
In 2001, Labaune was named a Fellow of the American Physical Society (APS), after a nomination from the APS Division of Plasma Physics, "for the most comprehensive study of parametric instabilities in laser produced plasmas, using novel and advanced applications of Thomson Scattering". She was named a chevalier of the Legion of Honour in 2010.

She won the Prix Lazare-Carnot of the French Academy of Sciences in 2009, and the Edward Teller Award of the American Nuclear Society in 2011, "for seminal experimental contributions to laser fusion research, notably for her work to control and understand laser coupling and parametric instabilities".
