= Jorge Kurchan =

Argentine-Italian statistical physicist (born 1959)

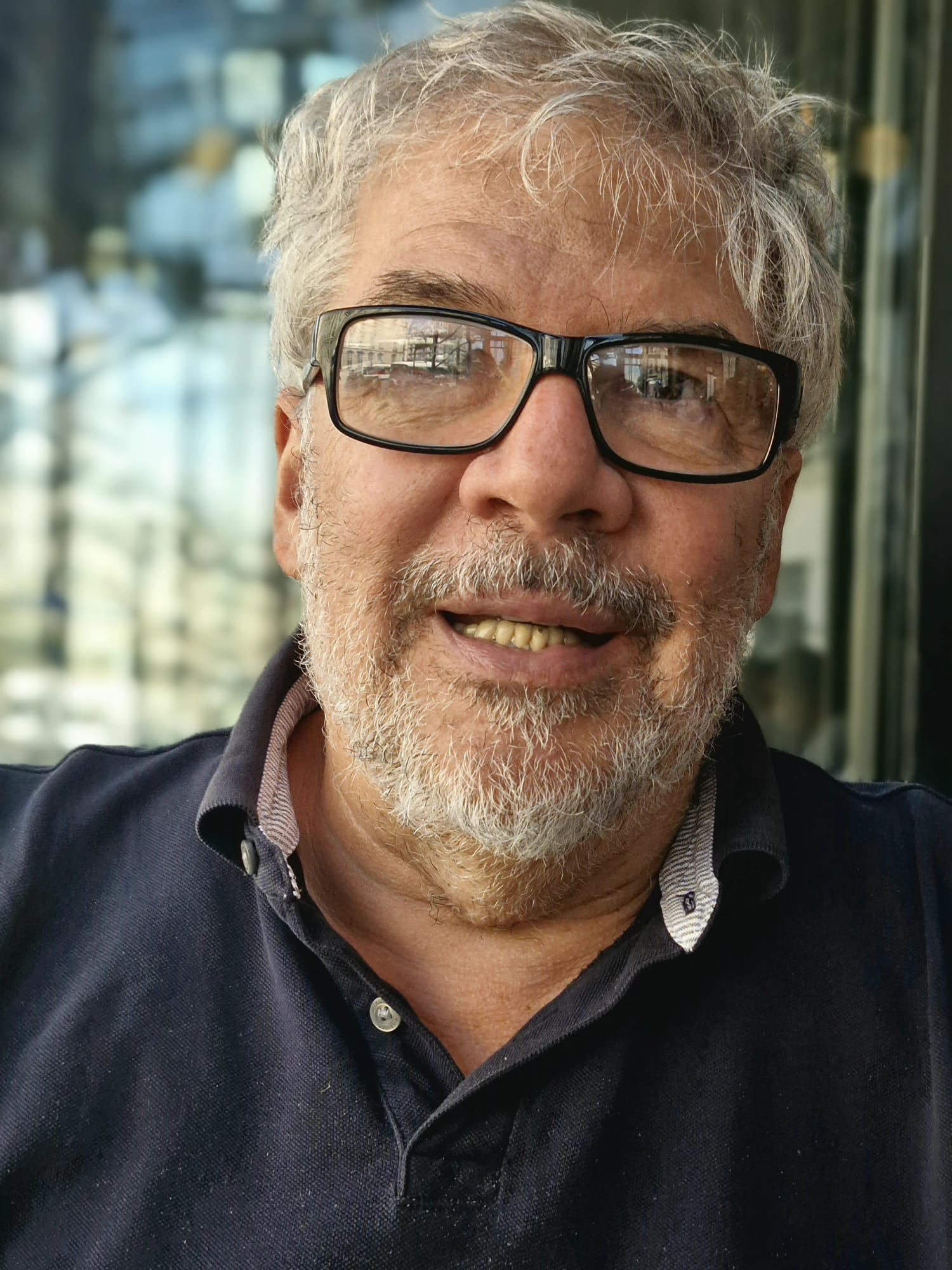
- Born: September 4, 1959 (age 66); Buenos Aires, Argentina
- Education: University of Buenos Aires
- Awards: Prix Paul Langevin (2002), Prix Servant de l'Académie des Sciences (2005), Lars Onsager Prize (2025)
- Scientific career
- Workplaces: ENS Lyon; ESPCI ParisTech; Henri Poincaré Institute; ENS Paris; CNRS
- Thesis: Coordenadas colectivas en problemas de muchos cuerpos (1989)
- Doctoral advisor: Daniel R. Bes
- Other academic advisors: Eytan Domany

Jorge Kurchan (born September 4, 1959) is an Argentine-Italian statistical physicist. He is currently Director of Exceptional Class Research at the French National Centre for Scientific Research (CNRS). His primary areas of study include statistical physics, non-equilibrium thermodynamics, and complex systems. Kurchan's research often explores topics such as glassy dynamics, stochastic processes, and the behavior of disordered systems, focusing on understanding the fundamental principles underlying the statistical mechanics of complex and out-of-equilibrium systems.

== Education and career ==
Kurchan was born in Buenos Aires, Argentina. He completed his master's degree in 1985 and his Ph.D. in 1989, both in physics at the University of Buenos Aires under Daniel R. Bes. He conducted postdoctoral research at the Weizmann Institute of Science in 1990 in the group of Eytan Domany and at the Sapienza University of Rome from 1991 to 1994. Kurchan joined École normale supérieure de Lyon as an associate researcher. In 1996, he became a CNRS research director at ESPCI ParisTech's physics and mechanics lab. He served as Deputy Director of the Henri Poincaré Institute from 2010 to 2013 and as Director of the Statistical Physics Laboratory at École normale supérieure in Paris from 2014 to 2018. Kurchan co-edited Europhysics Letters from 2002 to 2005 and currently edits Journal of Statistical Physics (2003–2014, 2018–present) and SciPost (2018–present).

== Recognition ==
Kurchan received the Prix Paul Langevin in 2002 from the Société Française de Physique. He received the Prix Servant de l'Académie des Sciences from the French Academy of Sciences in 2005. In 2025 he shared with JP Bouchaud and L Cugliandolo the Lars Onsager Prize from the American Physical Society.

== Bibliography ==
=== Books ===
- Bes, D R; Kurchan, J (1990). The Treatment of Collective Coordinates in Many-Body Systems: An Application of the BRST Invariance. World Scientific Lecture Notes in Physics. Vol. 34. WORLD SCIENTIFIC. Bibcode:1990tccm.book.....B. doi:10.1142/1163. ISBN 978-981-02-0306-1.
- Barrat, Jean-Louis; Feigelman, Mikhail; Kurchan, Jorge; Dalibard, Jean, eds. (2003). Slow Relaxations and nonequilibrium dynamics in condensed matter: Les Houches Session LXXVII, 1-26 July, 2002. Berlin, Heidelberg: Springer Berlin Heidelberg. doi:10.1007/b80352. ISBN 978-3-540-40141-4.

=== Selected publications ===
- Analytic solution of out-of-equilibrium mean field glass dynamics, and its relation to the phase-space landscape (with L. Cugliandolo)
- Identification of an effective temperature in out-of-equilibrium systems (with L. Cugliandolo and L. Peliti)
- High-dimensional geometry and slow dynamics (with L. Laloux)
- The first fluctuation theorem for stochastic dynamics
- Quantum fluctuation theorem and discussion of the measurement protocol
- Uncovering of hidden non-abelian symmetries in interacting particle systems and their relation to duality, along with the quantum extension of duality (with C. Giardinà, R. Frassek, F. Redig, and K. Vafayi)
- Analytic solution of liquid and glass dynamics in large dimensions (with T. Maimbourg and F. Zamponi)
- The "full" Eigenstate Thermalization Hypothesis (with L. Foini)
- Eigenstate Thermalization Hypothesis and Free Probability (with L. Foini and S. Pappalardi)
