= High energy density physics =

Subfield of physics

High-energy-density physics (HEDP) is a subfield of physics intersecting condensed matter physics, nuclear physics, astrophysics and plasma physics. It has been defined as the physics of matter and radiation at energy densities in excess of about 100 GJ/m^{3} equivalent to pressures of about 1 Mbar (or roughly 1 million times atmospheric pressure).

== Definition ==
High energy density (HED) science includes the study of condensed matter at densities common to the deep interiors of giant planets, and hot plasmas typical of stellar interiors. This multidisciplinary field provides a foundation for understanding a wide variety of astrophysical observations and understanding and ultimately controlling the fusion regime. Specifically, thermonuclear ignition by inertial confinement in the laboratory – as well as the transition from planets to brown dwarfs and stars in nature – takes place via the HED regime. A wide variety of new and emerging experimental capabilities (National Ignition Facility (NIF), Jupiter Laser Facility (JLF), etc.) together with the push towards Exascale Computing help make this new scientific frontier rich with discovery.

The HED domain is often defined by an energy density (units of pressure) above 1 Mbar = 100 GPa ~ 1 Million of Atmosphere. This is comparable to the energy density of a chemical bond such as in a water molecule. Thus at 1 Mbar, chemistry as we know it changes. Experiments at NIF now routinely probe matter at 100 Mbar. At these "atomic pressure" conditions the energy density is comparable to that of the inner core electrons, so the atoms themselves change. The dense HED regime includes highly degenerate matter, with interatomic spacing less than the de Broglie wavelength. This is similar to quantum regime achieved at low temperatures (e.g. Bose–Einstein condensation), however, unlike the low temperature analog, this HED regime simultaneously probes interatomic separations less than the Bohr radius. This opens an entirely new quantum mechanical domain, where core electrons - not just valence electrons - determine material properties and gives rise to core-electron-chemistry and a new structural complexity in solids. Potential exotic electronic, mechanical, and structural behavior of such matter include room temperature superconductivity, high-density electrides, first order fluid-fluid transitions, and new insulator-metal transitions. Such matter is likely quite common throughout the universe, existing in the more than 1000 recently discovered exoplanets.

== Importance ==
HED conditions at higher temperatures are important to the birth and death of stars and controlling thermonuclear fusion in the laboratory. Take as an example the birth and cooling of a neutron star. The central part of a star, ~8-20 times the mass of the Sun, fuses its way to iron and cannot go further since iron has the highest binding energy per nucleon of any element. As the iron core accumulates to ~1.4 solar masses, electron degeneracy pressure gives up against gravity and collapses. Initially the star cools by the rapid emission of neutrinos. The outer Fe surface layer (~10^{9} K) gives rise to spontaneous pair production then reaches a temperature where the radiation pressure is comparable to the thermal pressure and where thermal pressure is comparable to coulomb interactions.

Recent discoveries include metallic fluid hydrogen and superionic water.

== See also ==
- High energy physics
