= Inertial fusion power plant =

The Electra KrF laser demonstrates 90,000 shots over 10 hours, a repetition rate needed for an IFE power plant.

Inertial fusion energy is a proposed approach to building a nuclear fusion power plant based on performing inertial confinement fusion at industrial scale. This approach to fusion power is still in a research phase. ICF first developed shortly after the development of the laser in 1960, but was a classified US research program during its earliest years. In 1972, John Nuckolls wrote a paper predicting that compressing a target could create conditions where fusion reactions are chained together, a process known as fusion ignition or a burning plasma. On August 8, 2021, the NIF at Livermore National Laboratory became the first ICF facility in the world to demonstrate this (see plot). This breakthrough drove the US Department of Energy to create an Inertial Fusion Energy program in 2022 with a budget of 3 million dollars in its first year.

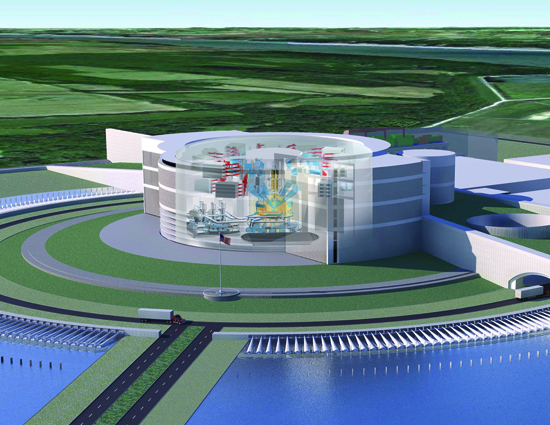
Conceptual design of the LIFE fusion power plant.

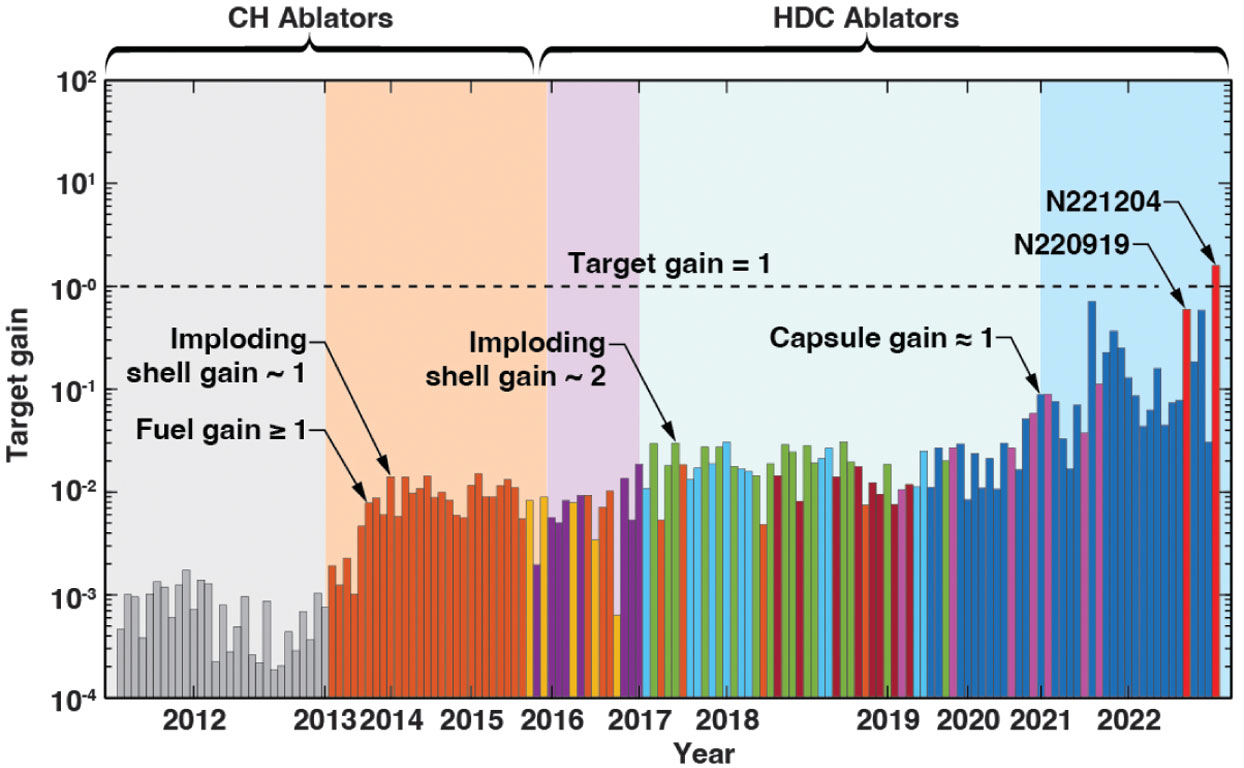
NIF target gain over 11 years shows a ten-fold increase in 2021 due to the achievement of ignition.

== Design of an IFE power plant ==
This kind of fusion reactor would consist of two parts:

- Targets which can be small capsules (<7 millimeter diameter) that contain fusion fuel. Although many kinds of targets have been tested including: cylinders, shells coated with nanotubes, solid blocks, hohlraum, glass shells filled with fusion fuel, cryogenically frozen targets, plastic shells, foam shells and materials suspended on spider silk.
- Drivers which are used to compress and create a shock wave that squeezes the target. This compression wave pushes the material inward, resulting in the temperature and pressure where fusion occurs. Drivers that have been explored are solid-state lasers, excimer lasers, high velocity solid objects, X-rays, beams of ions (heavy ion fusion (HIF)) and beams of electrons.

The basic mechanism for Inertial Confinement Fusion using a simple direct drive.

Net energy in ICF comes from getting fusion reactions to chain together in a process known as ignition. To get there we need to squeeze material to hot and dense conditions for long enough. But a key problem is that after a plasma becomes hot - it becomes hard to compress. The goal then is to avoid getting material hot until after it is compressed. In literature, this is known as the low adiabatic approach to compression. These steps are outlined below:

1. Keeping the plasma very cold, squeeze it together.
2. Heat the plasma only after it is squeezed; ideally inside a "hot spot".
3. Fusion happens, and the resulting products deposit their energy creating more fusion.

Several compression approaches attempt to do this including: Central Hot Spot Ignition, Fast Ignition, Shock Ignition and Magneto-inertial-fusion.

== Research institutions ==
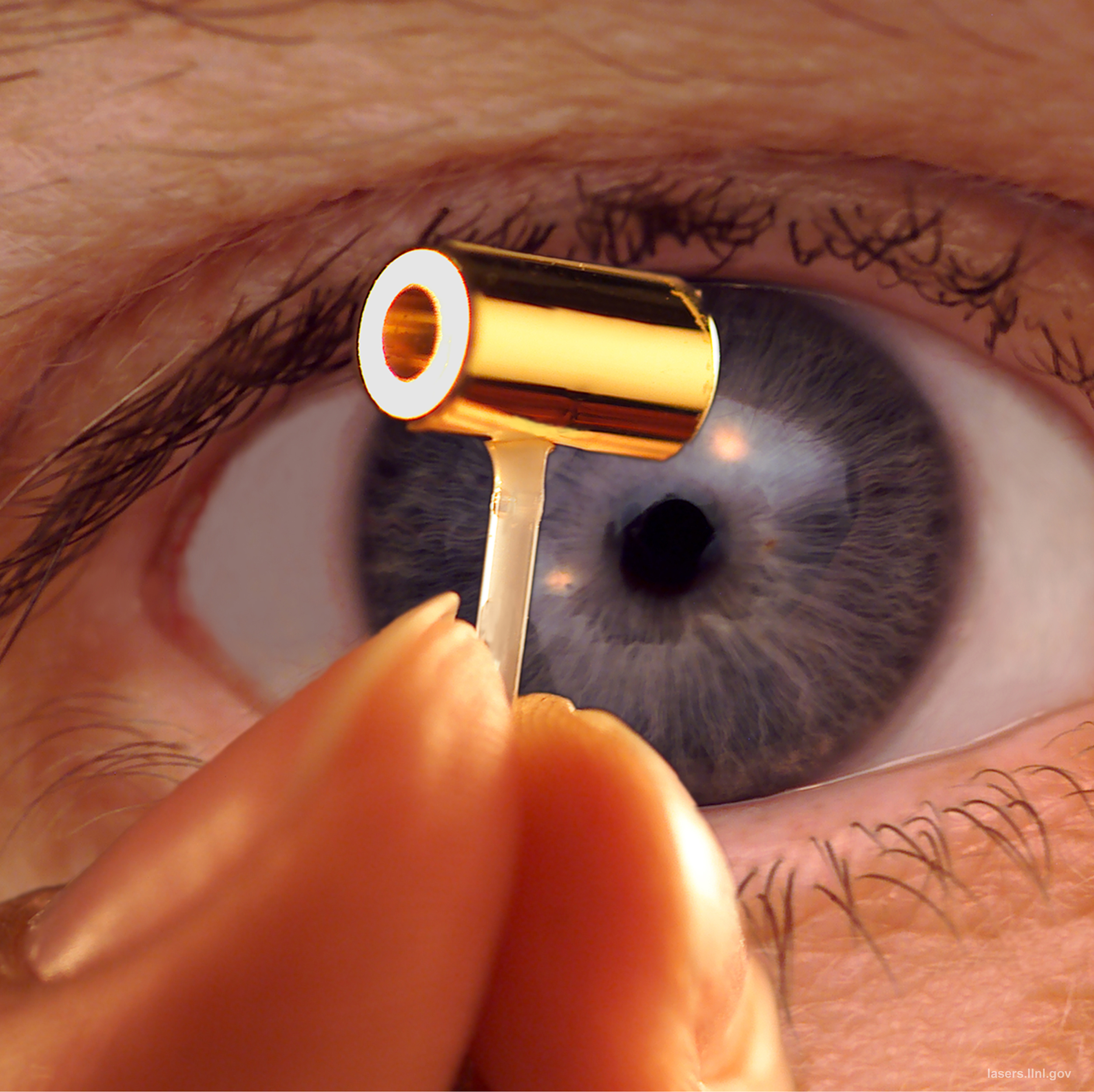
Mockup of a golden hohlraum used in laser inertial confinement.

This program was originally established as a way to develop Nuclear weapons, because ICF mimics the compression physics of a fission-fusion bomb. These facilities have been built around the world, below are some examples.

- Laser Mégajoule in France was developed in 2002 and upgraded in 2014.
- Omega Laser was first built in 1992 at the University of Rochester.
- Omega-EP was first built in 2008 at the University of Rochester as second more powerful laser beam.
- Gecko Laser was first built at Osaka University in Japan in 1983 but has since been upgraded nearly a dozen times.
- NIF was first operational in 2009 at the Livermore National Laboratory.
- NIKE Laser was built at the Naval Research Laboratory to study excimer (gas-based) lasers.
- Electra Laser was built at the Naval Research Laboratory to study excimer (gas-based) lasers.
- PALS laser facility in the Czech Republic was established to research ICF laser implosions.
- Machine 3 was developed by First Light Fusion to accelerate blocks of material to create a shockwave on the target.

There have also been multiple ICF facilities built, tested and decommissioned in the past. For example, Sandia National Laboratory pursued a series (<10 machines) of ion-beam and electron-beam driven ICF research program through the 1970s and into the middle 1980s. Alternatively, Los Alamos built a large, excimer laser facility called Aurora in the late 1980s. Livermore National Laboratory built a succession of laser facilities including Nova, Cyclops, 4-PI, SHIVA and other devices. As part of the run up to the NIF opening and achieving ignition, Livermore National Laboratory funded a body of research around the Laser Inertial Fusion Energy program. Under this program, a reactor design was developed, costing, reactor chambers and energy capture programs were explored.

== Research programs ==
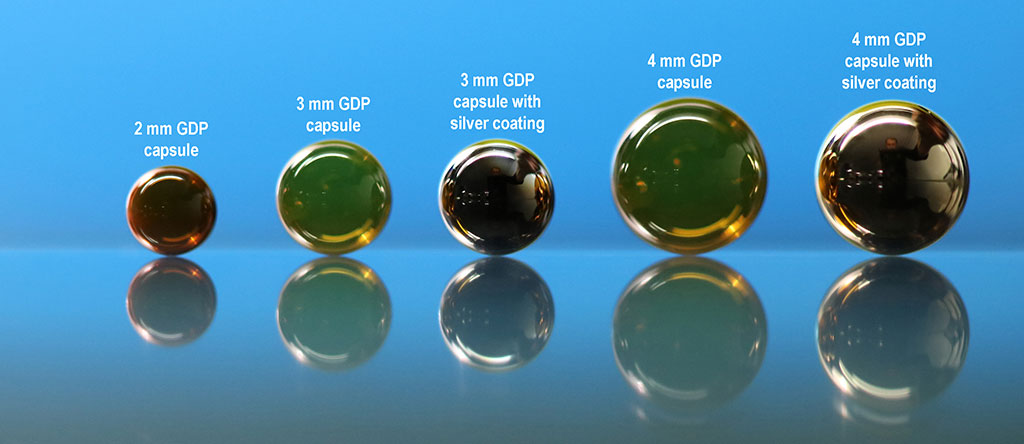
Glass Shell Targets

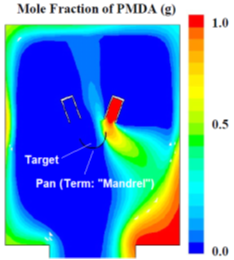
Coating round ICF targets is hard - above is a model of PDMA overcoating in a chamber

IFE development has come in waves within the United States. Below are some government programs that have been funded over the years to push this technology forward:

- HAPL The high average laser program was administered by the Naval Research Laboratory from 1999 to 2008. This program doled out grants to target, laser and driver teams across the United States and organized 19 meetings between member organizations.
- LIFE The Laser Inertial Fusion Energy program was administered by Livermore National Laboratory from 2008 to 2016. This program was funded to develop an IFE fusion power plant based around the National Ignition Facility.
- SDI The Strategic Defense Initiative (SDI) inadvertently supported many of the IFE laser technologies seen today.

== Driver development ==
It is still unclear which driver would work best for an IFE power plant, with supporters of different drivers pushing their favorite approach. Lasers have thus far proven to be the most well researched. Below is a summary of the laser drivers that have been studied. The challenge with implementing laser systems does not just come from the beam, but also the optics, mirrors, amplifiers and gratings that are also needed to put this system in place.

Comparing Driver Technology
Driver	Wavelength	Cost	Electric-to-light Efficiency	Repetition Rate	Advantages	Disadvantages
ArF laser (gas-based)	193 nm	cheaper	9-16%	?	Shorter wavelength improves compression. Gas does not retain heat, allowing for high rep rate shots.	Full scale laser module not demonstrated. Optical components are not well developed. Moderate separation foil stability.
KrF laser (gas-based)	248 nm	cheaper	7-10%	90,000 shots over 10 hours.	Shorter wavelength improves compression. Gas does not retain heat, allowing for high rep rate shots.	Full scale laser module not yet demonstrated. Optical components are not well developed. Moderate separation foil stability.
Nd-Doped Laser (Solid Laser)	1053 nm and/or 351 nm when tripled in frequency	expensive	1 (Flash lamp pump) to <30% (diode pumped) at 1053 nm.	45 minutes per shot (at minimum) on Omega, 1 shot per day on NIF.	Laser glass, coatings, optics and crystals have all been built or demonstrated on large flash lamp pumped systems.	Full scale diode pumped laser module not yet demonstrated. Lower repetition rates due to glass heating up.
High Velocity Projectile	N/A	Cheap	?	Depends on driver used. Railguns have been fundamentally limited in velocities. Gas guns have been shown to produce thermonuclear fusion. Solid liners that rip apart under high currents have performed the best.	Simpler technology	Thus far solid objects have not performed as a well as laser systems. Both the Z-Machine and First Light Fusion have developed experiments.
Beams of ions	N/A	Cheap	?	Beams of ions can be generated more readily than lasers or projectiles. But this driver generates plasma that dissipates into the chamber.	High repetition shots are possible.	A beam of ions are difficult to focus in on the target; the beam is ripped apart by the (+ to +) repulsive forces due to repulsion. Hence, it takes hardware, energy and effort to keep the beam coherent.

=== Related technologies ===
Depending on the driver that is being used there are key related technologies that need to be matured; below are some of these:

- Glass for making mirrors, lenses, gratings, or windows in the beamline that can handle the laser's high energy density.
- Amplifiers that can be used to increase the power of the laser beam.
- Compressors that can compress the laser beam or ion beam in space and time to increase the overall on-target power.
- Pulsed power systems that can deliver the megajoules needed to either a laser, ion-beam or solid object driver. The workhorse of pulsed power (the Marx Generator) has limitations for an ICF plant and research has gone into Linear transformer driver as an alternative power source.
- Laser diodes are used as the first step in transferring electrical energy into light energy to initiate the laser beam. Such systems can be expensive and are not needed for excimer lasers.
- Phase-plate smoothing is a technique to smooth out laser beams in solid-state laser systems.

== Target development ==
There are many kinds of targets that have been developed for ICF research - but a power plant would require thousands if not millions of identical targets to be fired repeatedly. This will be exceedingly challenging. At present, the Department of Energy contracts with General Atomics to produce ICF targets for the national laboratories. These targets are partially built at GA and then shipped across the country to the ICF facility for a shot day. The Laboratories maintain hardware and staff onsite to complete the last steps to prepare the targets for a shot.

=== Types ===
- Glass Shell targets were spheres of glass on stalks and filled with DT gas; these were some of the earliest targets.
- Overcoated targets involve growing chemical materials over a shell target. This can be done using directed Chemical Vapor Deposition of plastics or layers of gold or silvers.
- Hohlraum targets are pellets of DT fusion fuel that are surrounded by tubes of gold foil. The laser strikes the foil and creates x-rays that compresses the targets; simulates nuclear weapons.
- Silk-mounted targets have been mounted on strands of spider silk; this material is the strongest material per cross-section known and maintains good characteristics down to cryogenic temperatures.
- Cryogenic targets are those that must be kept below ≈34 Kelvin to condense the hydrogen gas into liquid or ≈14 kelvin to condense to a solid.
- Foam wetted targets are made using a variety of carbon-hydrogen foams and filled with liquid DT material cooled to below ≈34 Kelvin.
- Ice targets are made using a variety of carbon-hydrogen foams and filled with liquid DT material cooled to below ≈14 Kelvin.

=== Cryogenic targets ===
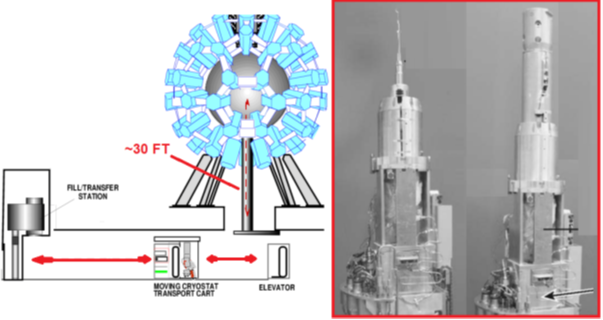
Keeping Cryogenic targets frozen while delivering them to target center is hard. At the LLE the target is held inside a cryogenic chamber and raised up to target chamber center on an elevator. Once the shroud is dropped from around the target it is exposed to air and starts melting. A laser pulse is then immediately required to compress it.

There are several ways to get tritium and deuterium into an already-made capsule. High pressure fills work by putting the shells in a chamber with 1 to 100 Atm of gas pressure and having the gas diffuse into the shell. Cryogenic foam shells work can work by wicking in the liquid DT fluid into the foam. This involves getting the delicate shell down in temperature and pressure without damaging it. This is a stepwise process that can take hours to days in time and requires multiple containment chambers and various kinds of pumps. At cryogenic temperatures, the DT gas forms into a fluid which can be wicked into the foam shell. Once filled, operators slowly lower the temperature further to form the ice crystal. Ice can start formation around the equator of the target and then grow into a complete crystal. The ice is embedded with the foam shell structure. Engineers have had problems with ice cracking during this formation process – all of which impacts the performance of the shot. Monitoring of all of this is done using shadow grams, 360 X-ray diagnostics, visual inspection, and other tools; information is all run through software that gets a complete picture of the target during filling.

=== Moving cryogenic targets ===
Keeping an ICF frozen at cryogenic temperatures while delivering it to the chamber for a shot is challenging. For example, at the Laboratory for Laser Energetics the frozen target is held inside a custom-built, mobile cryogenic cart that can be moved into position under the target chamber. The cart has a coolant system and vacuum pump to keep the material cold. This cart holds the frozen target at the end of a "cold finger" which is then raised on an elevator and positioned at the center of the chamber. When the metal shroud is removed, the cryogenic target is exposed to room temperatures and starts to sublimate immediately into gas. This means that laser pulses must coordinate directly with the exposure of the target and everything has to happen quickly to keep the target from melting.

== See also ==
- Nuclear fusion
- Fusion power
- Inertial electrostatic confinement
- Inertial confinement fusion
- Laser inertial confinement
- Megajoule laser
- National Ignition Facility
- Z-pinch inertial confinement
- Z Pulsed Power Facility
- Project PACER
- Heavy ion fusion
