= ATLAS-I =

Cold War military equipment of the US

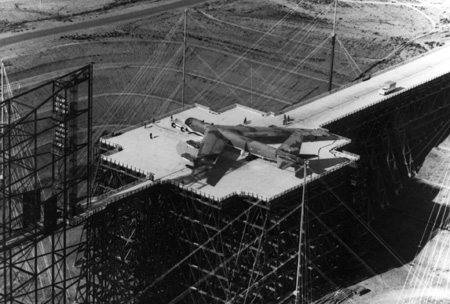
A Boeing B-52 strategic bomber being prepared for EMP testing at Trestle in 1982.

ATLAS-I (Air Force Weapons Lab Transmission-Line Aircraft Simulator), better known as Trestle, was a unique electromagnetic pulse (EMP) generation and testing apparatus built between 1972 and 1980 during the Cold War at Sandia National Laboratories near Kirtland Air Force Base in Albuquerque, New Mexico.

ATLAS-I was the largest NNEMP (non-nuclear electromagnetic pulse) generator in the world, designed to test the radiation hardening of strategic aircraft systems against EMP pulses from nuclear warfare. Built at a cost of $60 million, it was composed of two parts: a pair of powerful Marx generators capable of simulating the electromagnetic pulse effects of a high-altitude nuclear explosion (HANE) of the type expected during a nuclear war, and a giant wooden trestle built in a bowl-shaped arroyo, designed to elevate the test aircraft above ground interference and orient it below the pulse in a similar manner to what would be seen in mid-air.

Trestle is the world's largest structure composed entirely of wood and glue laminate.

== EMP generator ==
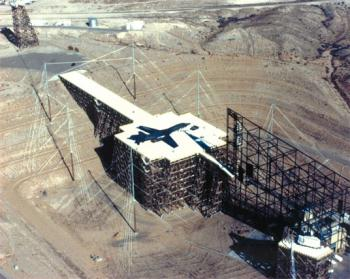
A Rockwell B-1B strategic bomber is readied for testing at Trestle in 1989. Note the elevated Marx generator to the right, the aircraft platform in the center, the sensor towers to the sides of the platform and the resistive termination tower at the rear.

The electromagnetic pulse was produced by a pair of Marx generators built by Maxwell Laboratories of San Diego, California. The generators were mounted on pedestals constructed of wood in the same manner as the main test platform, one on each side of a large wedge shaped steel structure which acted as a ground plane for the horizontally polarized pulse. Each Marx generator consisted of a stack of 50 trays, each containing two large capacitors and a plasma switch. A large peaking capacitor, used to adjust the shape of the resulting pulse, was also part of the design. Each generator was enclosed in a large fiberglass structure which was filled with sulfur hexafluoride (SF_{6}) acting as an insulating gas. The tray capacitors were slowly charged such that each tray had up to 100kV of potential. When discharged through the plasma switches, the 50 trays in series could (ideally) produce up to 5 megavolts of electrical potential in a pulse with a rise-time in the 100 nanosecond range. The generators on either side of the wedge were charged to opposite polarities and fired into twin transmission lines (antennas) mounted on either side of the test platform. When triggered simultaneously the resulting EM waves from each generator combined at the sharp point of the wedge building, adding to a total electrical potential of 10 megavolts. The transmission lines were terminated into a 50 ohm low inductance resistive load mounted on a tall wooden tower at the far end of the platform. The result was a fast 200 gigawatt pulse of electromagnetic flux powerful enough to reliably reproduce (at short range) the deleterious effects of a thermonuclear detonation on electronic circuitry as created by such examples as the HARDTACK I, ARGUS and DOMINIC I (Operation Fishbowl) high altitude nuclear tests.

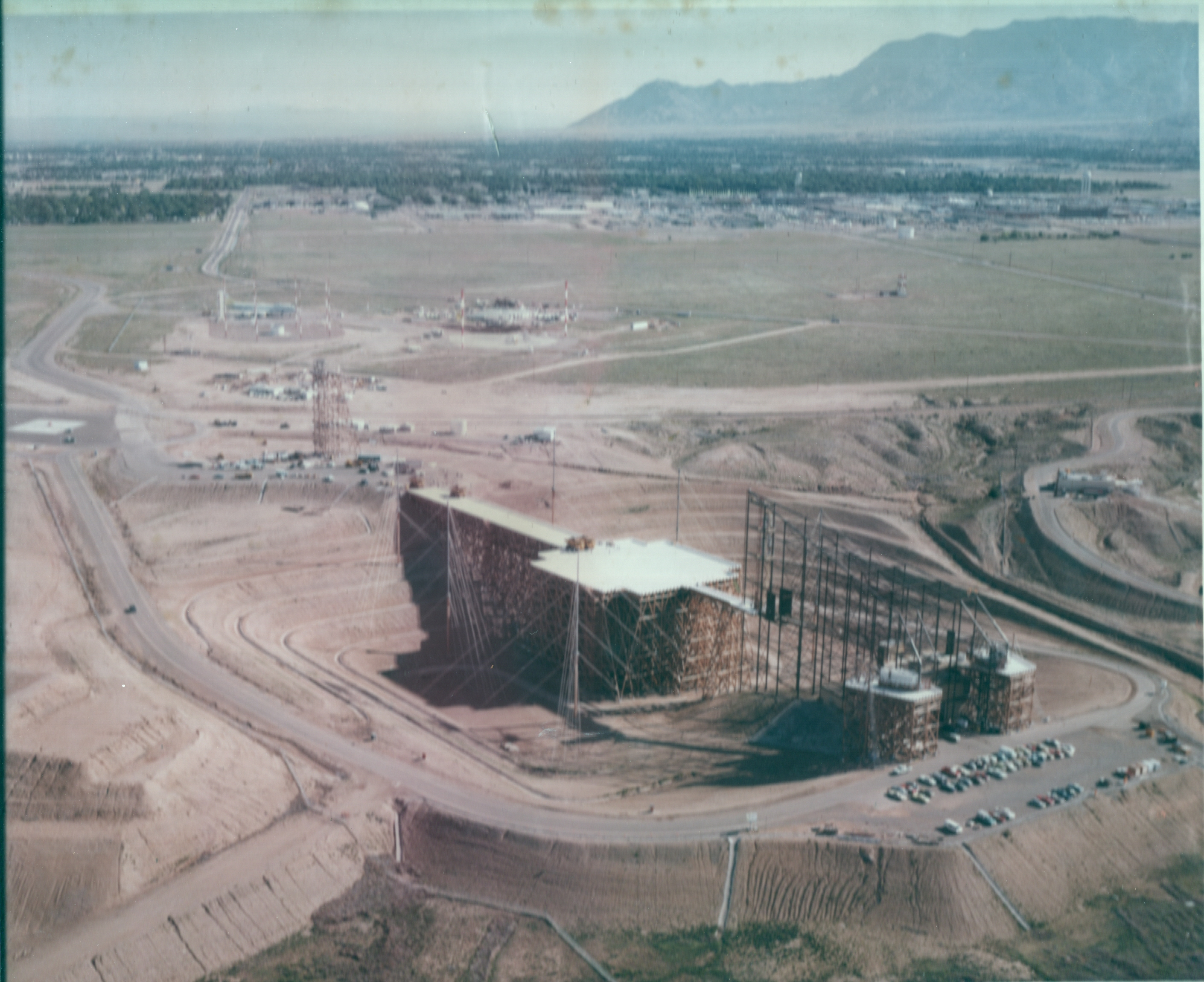
The platform was load tested by driving loaded TEREX mining dump trucks in an array across the deck. Notice Air Force 1 being tested at the neighboring Vertically Polarized Dipole (VPD) EMP test site in this 1979 photograph.

Due to their higher flight altitude and nuclear payload, Strategic Air Command bombers were the primary object of the tests, but fighters, transport aircraft and even missiles were also tested for EMP hardness on Trestle. In addition to electronics survivability tests, numerous sensors located inside, beneath and to the sides of the aircraft would gather additional data on the airframe's EMP permeability to be used in design considerations for future Cold War aircraft and to identify areas which needed additional EM hardening.

The advances made in EMP generation technology by Sandia during the operation of Trestle greatly assisted in the construction of the much more powerful 40 megavolt, 50 terawatt (50,000 gigawatt) Z Machine at Sandia during the 1990s. Technological advances during the 2000s have since boosted this output to 290 terawatts (290,000 gigawatts), high enough to actually study nuclear fusion at the point of detonation.

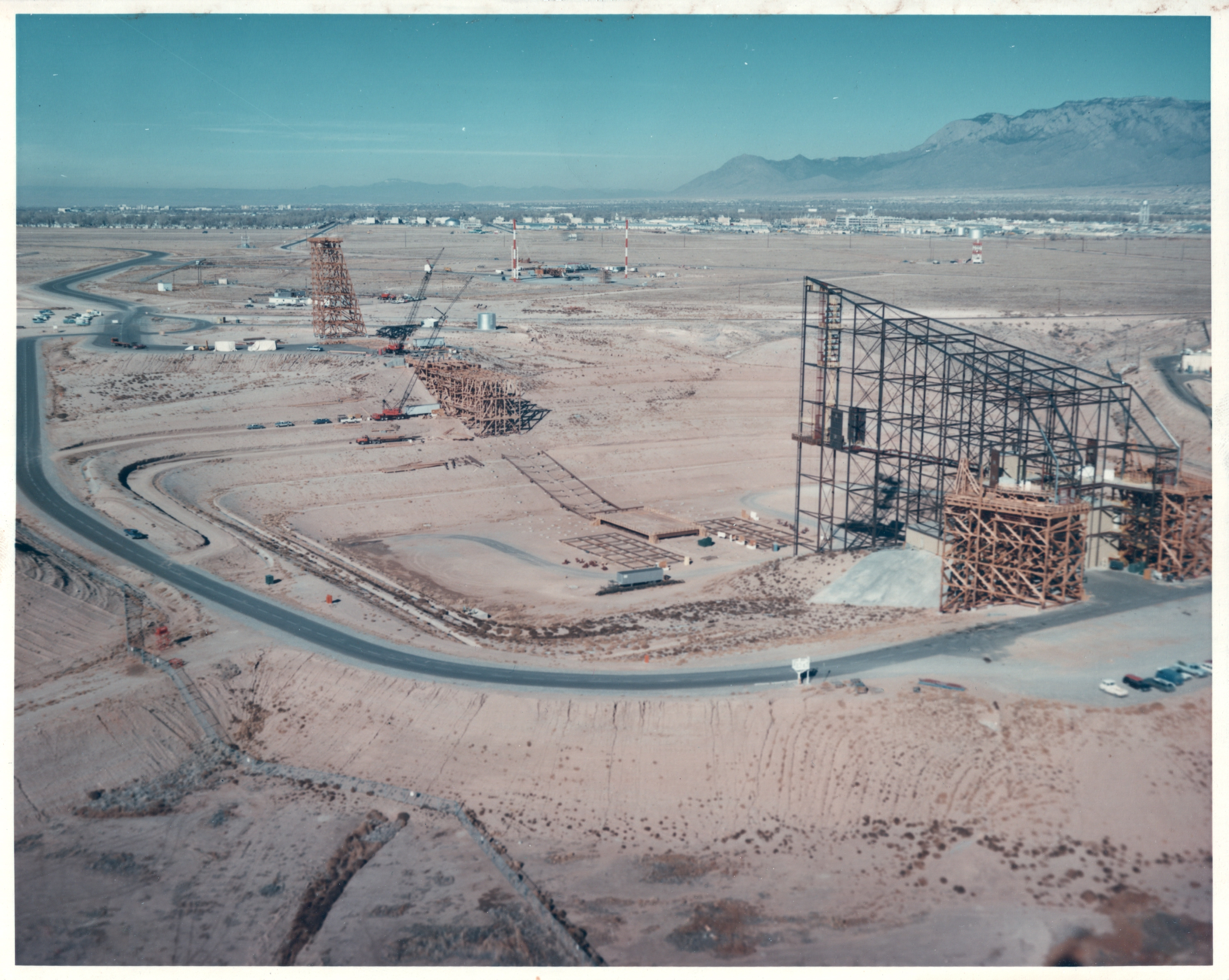
The Trestle facility under construction in 1975. The height of the termination tower was driven by the need to clear the tail of a C5A Galaxy transport.

== Trestle structure ==
The primary wooden structure of Trestle was built inside a natural depression spanning 600 feet across and 120 feet in depth, equivalent to a 12-story-tall building. A wooden ramp 400 feet long by 50 feet wide led to a test stand which itself measured 200 feet by 200 feet. A total of 6.5 million board-feet of lumber were used to build the structure, sufficient to support a fully loaded B-52 (then the largest and heaviest strategic bomber in the US inventory) while also minimizing any chance of interference from the ground or the structure itself, creating a reasonable simulation of airborne conditions. A mix of Douglas fir and Southern yellow pine were used for the timbers, as both showed excellent EMP transparency with the former having the best tensile strength and the latter the best weather resistance. By using an all glued laminated timber structure and woodworking joints to mate the giant timbers, with the joints being held together with wooden bolts and nuts, measurements from the EMP tests would not be skewed by large amounts of ferrous material in the structure. Some metal was used in the construction as critically loaded joints incorporated a circular steel shear ring that surrounded the wooden bolt clamping the joint. Even the fire escape along one side of the trestle and the whole of the extensive fire suppression piping were constructed of fiberglass.

== Wedge building ==
On the other side of the platform was the transmission "wedge", 250 feet in length with a total height of 240 feet. The wedge was constructed using steel I-beams. The entire structure was covered with a wire mesh similar to livestock fencing in order to create an enormous Faraday cage. A multistory building was constructed inside the wedge which served as offices, laboratories and testing facilities. The second floor of the building housed a large electromagnetically shielded room, supplied by Electromagnetic Filter Company of Palo Alto, California, which contained the data acquisition electronics, the Marx generator charging and firing control and field strength monitoring instrumentation. The data acquisition system consisted of a large number of state-of-the-art Tektronix 7912AD digitizers along with a large array of Digital Equipment Corporation PDP-11 computers. The pulse monitoring instrumentation consisted of a number of B dot and H field sensors mounted on the exterior of the wedge connected to oscilloscopes fitted with Polaroid cameras to capture the transient pulse data. The open-air third floor held large inflatable gas bags which could store the sulfur hexafluoride (SF_{6}) gas from the Marx generator enclosures when they needed to be opened for maintenance.

== Current status ==
The ATLAS-I program was shut down after the end of the Cold War in 1991, which brought an end to destructive EMP testing of aircraft by the Air Force, being replaced by far cheaper computer simulations as technology improved. Despite going without maintenance 20 years, the wooden trestle structures were all still standing in 2011, and the structure remained the biggest metal-free wood laminate structure in the world. The trestle had become a significant fire hazard since the pentachlorophenol-isobutane-ether-treated wood had dried considerably in the desert conditions and the automatic fire sprinkler system had been deactivated in 1991. Efforts were underway to secure the funding necessary to have the structure protected as a National Historic Landmark, although efforts are complicated by the top secret nature of the Sandia/Kirtland facility.

The trestle structure is visible from commercial aircraft landing and taking off from Albuquerque International Sunport, lying about one mile to the southeast of the threshold of Runway 26 at 35.02981109416866°N 106.55767558197573°W.

The site and the testing that occurred there is described in the British TV Series Abandoned Engineering, Season 10, Episode 2, first airing on September 12, 2022.

== See also ==
- Radiation hardening
- High-altitude nuclear explosion
- STARFISH Prime
- Istra High Voltage Research Center
