= William B. Bridges =

American engineer and inventor (1934–2024)

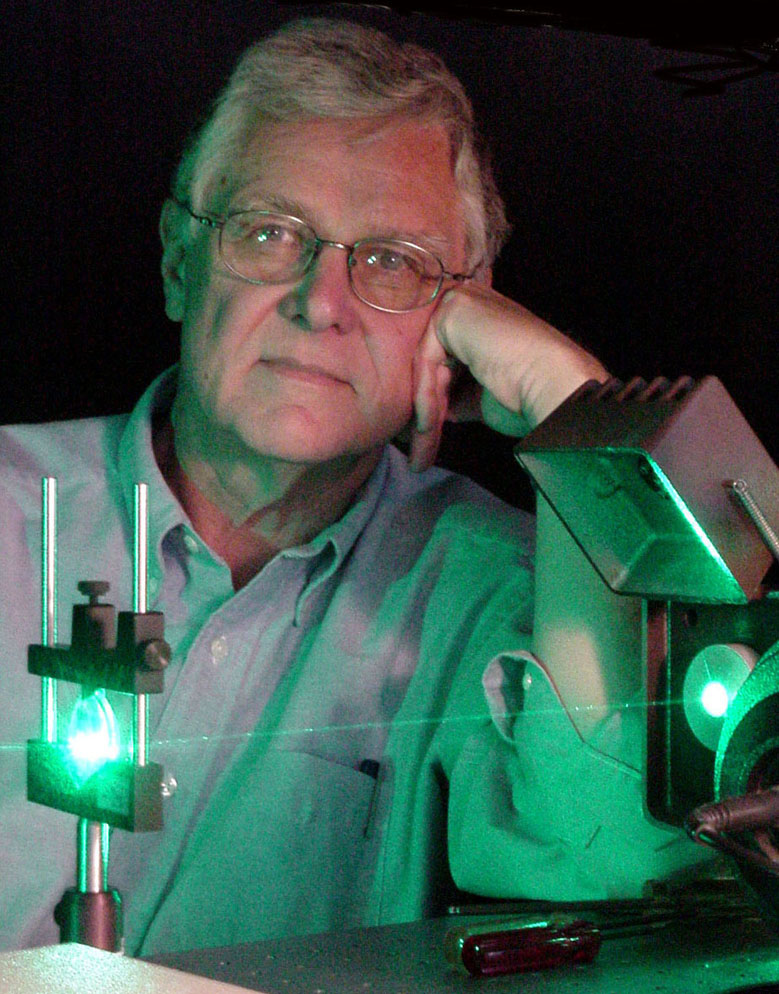
- Bridges in 2005
- Born: November 29, 1934; Inglewood, California, U.S.
- Died: November 1, 2024 (aged 89)
- Education: University of California at Berkeley
- Scientific career
- Fields: Applied Physics Electrical Engineering
- Workplaces: Hughes Research Laboratories; California Institute of Technology

William B. Bridges (November 29, 1934 – November 1, 2024) was an American engineer and inventor who was the Carl F. Braun Professor of Engineering, Emeritus, and Professor of Electrical Engineering and Applied Physics in the Engineering and Applied Science division at the California Institute of Technology. Born in Inglewood, California, he was the discoverer/inventor of the Argon Ion laser, and held the patent for the Ionized Noble Gas Laser.

== Life ==
Bridges received his undergraduate and graduate education at the University of California at Berkeley (BS electrical engineering 1956; MS 1957; PhD 1962). His graduate research dealt with noise in microwave tubes and electron-stream instabilities (which later became the basis of the Vircator high power microwave oscillator).

He joined the Hughes Research Laboratories division of the Hughes Aircraft Company in 1960 where he worked briefly on microwave vacuum tubes, then gas lasers. He discovered and patented the noble gas (argon, krypton, xenon) ion lasers in 1964, lasers that are still around 50 years later (in DNA sequencers, cell sorters, eye surgery, and at laser light shows.) He worked on many projects using lasers: an airborne night reconnaissance system (AN/AVD-3), space communications systems, early high power laser weapons (the carbon dioxide gas dynamic laser, now extinct), hydrogen maser clocks for the global positioning system.

He was a Sherman Fairchild Distinguished Scholar at Caltech in 1974-75, and in 1977 became Professor of Electrical Engineering and Applied Physics; then the Carl F Braun Professor of Engineering in 1983. His work at Caltech included microwaves, millimeter waves, lasers, optics, and opto-electronics. In the early 1980s he recruited female undergraduate advisees and reactivated the Society for Women Engineers Chapter at Caltech. He had seen the dearth of female engineers, and how uncomfortable they were in the field, and hoped to get women interested in engineering. An amateur radio operator (a ‘ham’) since the age of 14, he was a very active member of the Caltech Amateur Radio Club. He held an Amateur Extra Class license, W6FA.

Bridges was awarded the Arthur L. Schawlow Medal from the Laser Institute of America in 1988; received the Distinguished Teaching Award in 1980 and 1982, and the Lifetime Excellence in Teaching Award in 2000 from the Associated Students of Caltech.

In 1977, Bridges was elected a member of the National Academy of Engineering for the development of practical lasers using oscillation in noble gas ions and for contributions to electro-optic systems. He was a Fellow of the IEEE; the Optical Society of America, where he was president in 1988; and the Laser Institute of America. A member of the National Academy of Sciences, he was on the committee of the U.S. Air Force Scientific Advisory Board 1985-89. He was also elected to the American Academy of Arts and Sciences. He was a member of the Board of Directors of Uniphase Corporation 1986-98, and a member of the Board at Access Laser Corp.

Bridges died on November 1, 2024, at the age of 89.

== Publications ==
- 60 AND 94 GHz Wave-Coupled Electro-Optic Modulators (1996)
- Coupled Waveguide Gas Laser Research (1992)
- Velocity Matched Millimeterwave Electro-Optic Modulator (1993)

== See also ==
- Optical Society of America § Past Presidents of the OSA
