= Istra High Voltage Research Center =

Research institute in the Soviet Union

High Voltage Research Center
- Near Istra, Istrinsky District, Moscow Oblast in Russia

Site information
- Type: Energy weapon testing, mixed use
- Operator: Soviet Union, Russia
- Status: Mostly inactive

Location
- Coordinates: 55°55′26.15″N 36°49′10.97″E

Site history
- In use: 1970s – present (since 1991 only in intermittent use)

The High Voltage Research Center (HVRC) (Russian: Высоковольтный научно-исследовательский центр), also called the Tesla Generators Research Facility, is a testing facility built in the 1970s outside the town of Istra, 40 km (25 mi) west of Moscow, operated by the Moscow Power Engineering Institute.

== Description ==
The facility is notable for containing what is believed to be the world's largest Marx generator, which was originally created to help test lightning insulation in military aircraft. The facility has several huge Tesla coils on the facility grounds, some of which range over 20 stories in height. Combined these create what the Soviets nicknamed a "lightning machine."

In all the facility contains a 3 megawatt capacity transformer cascade, a 9 megawatt Pulsed Voltage Generator (PVG), measuring 39.3 meters high and capable of creating 150-meter artificial lightning, and a 2.25 megawatt constant voltage unit.

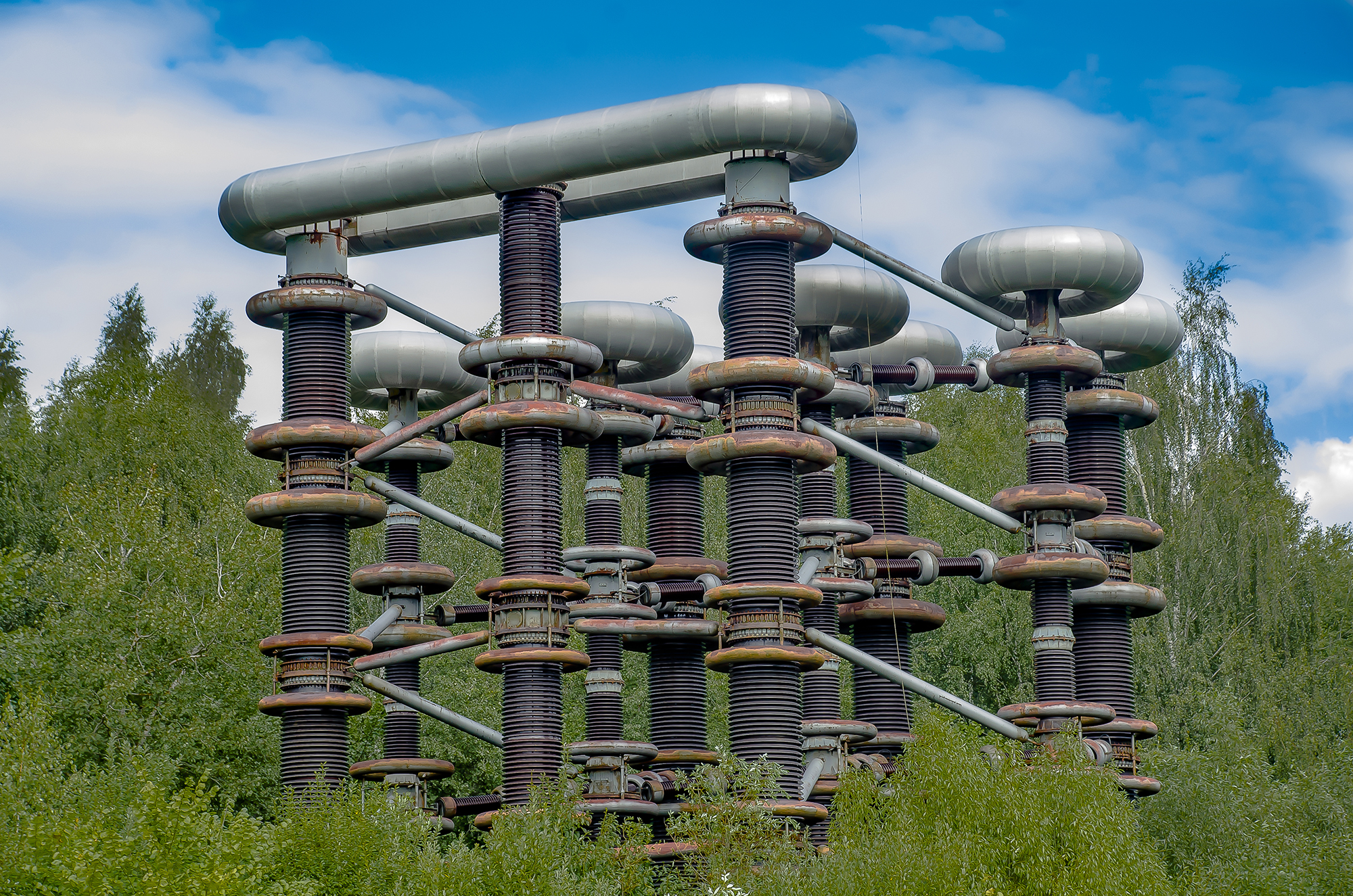
Electro-Polygon generator of Arkadyev-Marx High-Voltage Scientific Research Center of All-Russian Electrotechnical Institute in Istra, Russia

== History ==
Originally built sometime in the 1970s, the facility was at first used for a mix of military and scientific testing being maintained by the Moscow Power Engineering Institute.

After the fall of the Soviet Union the facility became mostly inactive, only being used on occasion for private-sector testing, including testing of the lightning strike resistance of the Sukhoi Superjet 100 in 2011.

The Marx generator is rarely turned on today, with the last recorded use being in August 2014.

=== Dome ===
Construction of a large ovoidal dome, officially named the "High-voltage test bench of the enterprise R-6511" (Russian: "Высоковольтный испытательный стенд предприятия Р-6511"), but also known as the "Istra dome", began in 1982. The building was to be used as an electromagnetic pulse (EMP) weapons testing facility, with commissioning planned for the fourth quarter of 1985, but construction was never completed: the dome collapsed in the morning of 25 January 1985, and was later demolished.

This resulted in I. N. Dmitriev, head of the Construction Department of the CPSU Central Committee, being removed from his post and replaced by Boris Yeltsin in April 1985. Yeltsin would later serve as the first President of the Russian Federation.

After the dome's collapse, thousands of tons of reinforced concrete were removed from the site.

Later a facility called the "Stationary electromagnetic pulse simulator 'Allure'" (Russian: "Стационарный имитатор электромагнитного импульса 'Аллюр'"), or simply "Allure", was built on the former site of the dome. "Allure" was used for testing the resistance of equipment to the effects of natural and man-made EMPs.

== See also ==
- Bely Rast High Voltage Research Station
- ATLAS-I
