= Linear transformer driver =

A linear transformer driver (LTD) within physics and energy, is an annular parallel connection of switches and capacitors. The driver is designed to deliver rapid high power pulses. The LTD was invented at the Institute of High Current Electronics (IHCE) in Tomsk, Russia. The LTD is capable of producing high-current high-voltage pulses of up to 1 mega amps (10^{6} ampere) with a rise time of less than 100 ns. This is an improvement over Marx generator based pulsed power devices which require pulse compression to achieve such fast risetimes. It is being considered as a driver for z-pinch based inertial confinement fusion.

== LTDs at Sandia National Laboratories ==
Sandia National Laboratory is currently investigating a z-pinch as a possible ignition source for inertial confinement fusion. On its "Z machine", Sandia can achieve dense, high temperature plasmas by firing fast, 100-nanosecond current pulses exceeding 20 million amps through hundreds of tungsten wires with diameters on the order of tens of micrometres. The LTD is currently being investigated as a driver for the next generation of high power accelerators.

Sandia's roadmap includes another future Z machine version called ZN (Z Neutron) to test higher yields in fusion power and automation systems. ZN is planned to give between 20 and 30 MJ of hydrogen fusion power with a shot per hour thanks to LTDs replacing the current Marx generators. After 8 to 10 years of operation, ZN would become a transmutation pilot plant capable of a fusion shot every 100 seconds.

The next step planned would be the Z-IFE (Z-inertial fusion energy) test facility, the first true z-pinch driven prototype fusion power plant. It is suggested it would integrate Sandia's latest designs using LTDs. Sandia labs recently proposed a conceptual 1 petawatt (10^{15} watts) LTD Z-pinch power plant, where the electric discharge would reach 70 million amperes.

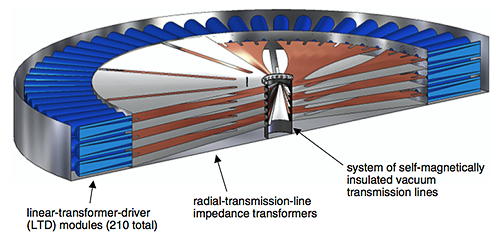
Proposed model of a 1,000 terawatt LTD-based z-pinch accelerator. 104 m diameter, 70 million amperes, 24 megavolts. Human being (the black line just left of the center of the LTD) for scale.

== See also ==
- Electromagnetic forming
- Electromagnetic pulse (EMP)
- Magnetic pulse welding
- Power (physics)
- Pulsed power
