= Water capacitor =

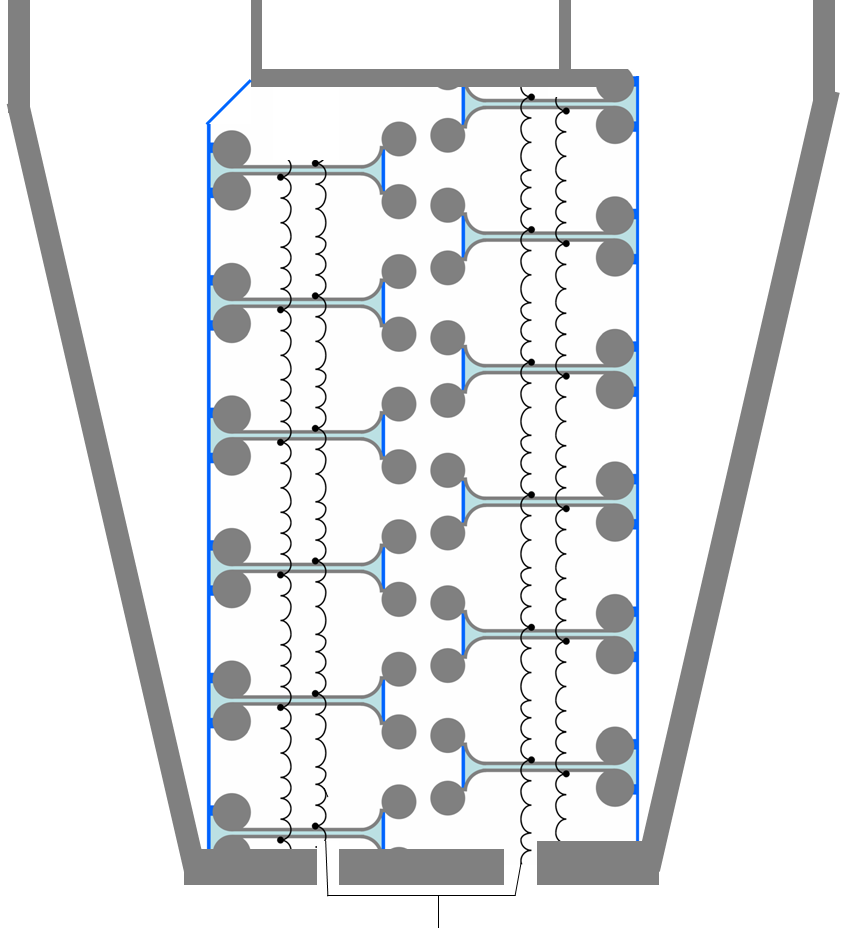
Graphical representation of an inductively coupled Marx generator, based on water capacitors. The blue is the water between the plates, and the balls in the central column are the spark gaps that break over to allow the capacitors to charge in parallel, and discharge rapidly in series.

A water capacitor is a device that uses water as its dielectric insulating medium.

== Theory of operation ==
A capacitor is a device in which electrical energy is introduced and can be stored for a later time. A capacitor consists of two conductors separated by a non-conductive region. The non-conductive region is called the dielectric or electrical insulator. Examples of traditional dielectric media are air, paper, and certain semiconductors. A capacitor is a self-contained system, isolated with no net electric charge. The conductors must hold equal and opposite charges on their facing surfaces.

== Water as a dielectric ==
Conventional capacitors use materials such as glass or ceramic as their insulating medium to store an electric charge. Water capacitors were created mainly as a novelty item or for laboratory experimentation and can be made with simple materials. Water exhibits the quality of being self-healing; if there is an electrical breakdown through the water, it quickly returns to its original and undamaged state. Other liquid insulators are prone to carbonization after breakdown and tend to lose their hold off strength over time. These characteristics, along with the high dielectric constant, make water an excellent choice for building large capacitors.

The drawback to using water is the short length of time it can hold off the voltage, typically in the microsecond to ten microsecond (μs) range. Deionised water is relatively inexpensive and is environmentally safe. If a way can be found to reliably increase the hold off time for a given field strength, then there will be more applications for water capacitors.

Water has been shown not to be a very reliable substance to store electric charge long term, so more reliable materials are used for capacitors in industrial applications. However, water has the advantage of being self-healing after a breakdown, and if the water is steadily circulated through a de-ionizing resin and filters, then the loss resistance and dielectric behavior can be stabilized. Thus, in certain unusual situations, such as the generation of extremely high voltage but very short pulses, a water capacitor may be a practical solution – such as in an experimental X-ray pulser.

A dielectric material is defined as a material that is an electrical insulator. An electrical insulator is a material that does not allow the flow of charge. Charge can flow as electrons or ionic chemical species. By this definition, liquid water is not an electrical insulator, and, hence, liquid water is not a dielectric. The self-ionization of water is a process in which a small proportion of water molecules dissociate into positive and negative ions. It is this process that gives pure liquid water its inherent electrical conductivity.

Because of self-ionization, at ambient temperatures, pure liquid water has a similar intrinsic charge carrier concentration to the semiconductor, germanium, and an intrinsic charge carrier concentration three orders of magnitude greater than the semiconductor, silicon; hence, based on charge carrier concentration, water can not be considered to be a purely dielectric material or full electrical insulator but to be a limited conductor of charge.

== Experimental ==
The discharge of a platinum parallel-plate capacitor placed in a vessel filled with ultrapure water has been measured. The observed discharge trend could be described by a Modified Poisson-Boltzmann Equation only when the voltage was very low and the system capacitance showed a dependence on the spacing between the two platinum plates. The permittivity of water, calculated considering the system as a plane capacitor, appeared to be very high.

An examination was made of the effect of applying voltages from 0.1 to 0.82V on pure water between metal electrodes. The movement of hydronium ions away from and hydroxide ions towards the anode was followed. This movement resulted in the formation of an ion double-layer with a steeply rising electric field and a maximum pH of approximately 12. At the cathode, the opposite occurred and the pH reaches a minimum of approximately 1.7. Thus pure water in a static electric field is not a homogeneous substance but may be considered to have three zones:

(i) a zone containing excess positively charged aqueous hydrogen ions through which the electric field strength changes

(ii) an intermediate zone containing pure water in which there is no significant electric field

(iii) a zone containing excess negatively charged aqueous hydroxide ions through which the electric field strength changes.

The transition from conductive to dielectric screening of electric fields by a tube of pure water has been investigated using a parallel plate capacitor that was used to generate a uniform electric field. Two concentric acrylic plexiglass tubes passed perpendicularly through the electric field generated between the plates. The region between the tubes was filled with air or water. An electrode, suspended within the inner plexiglass tube, was used to sense the electric potential at its location. The sensor was designed so that it could be rotated to measure the potential at a second symmetric position. From the difference in the two potentials, the frequency dependence of the magnitude and phase of the electric field could be determined. With deionised water between the tubes, the magnitude and phase of the interior electric field was measured from 100 Hz to 300 kHz. The high-pass filter frequency response expected for a dielectric tube with non-negligible conductivity was observed. Fits to the data yielded a very reasonable experimental value for the ratio of the water's conductivity to its dielectric constant. The model also predicted that at zero frequency (a static electric field) pure water would be expected to behave as a Faraday cage, which is natural given water's capacity to conduct electricity.

== Applications ==
A simple type of water capacitor is created by using water-filled glass jars and some form of insulating material to cover the ends of the jar. Water capacitors are not widely used in the industrial community due to their large physical size for a given capacitance. The conductivity of water can change very quickly and is unpredictable if left open to atmosphere. Many variables such as temperature, pH levels, and salinity have been shown to alter conductivity in water. As a result, there are better alternatives to the water capacitor in the majority of applications.

The pulse-withstand voltage of carefully purified water can be very high – over 100kV/cm (comparing to about 10 cm for the same voltage in dry air).

A capacitor is designed to store electric energy when disconnected from its charging source. Compared to more conventional devices, water capacitors are currently not practical devices for industrial applications. Capacitance can be increased by the addition of electrolytes and minerals to the water, but this increases the self leakage, and cannot be done beyond its saturation point.

== Hazards and benefits ==
Modern high voltage capacitors may retain their charge long after power is removed. This charge can cause dangerous, or even potentially fatal, shocks if the stored energy is more than a few joules. At much lower levels, stored energy can still cause damage to connected equipment. Water capacitors, being self-discharging, (for totally pure water, only thermally ionized, at 25 °C (77 °F) the ratio of conductivity to permittivity means that self-discharge time is circa 180μs, faster with higher temperatures or dissolved impurities) usually cannot be made to store enough residual electrical energy to cause serious bodily injury.

Unlike many large, industrial, high voltage capacitors, water capacitors do not require oil. Oil found in many older designs of capacitors can be toxic to both animals and humans. If a capacitor breaks open and its oil is released, the oil often finds its way into the water table, which can cause health problems over time.

== History ==
Capacitors can originally be traced back to a device called a Leyden jar, created by the Dutch physicist Pieter van Musschenbroek. The Leyden jar consisted of a glass jar with tin foil layers on the inside and outside of the jar. A rod electrode was directly connected to the inlayer of foil by means of a small chain or wire. This device stored static electricity created when amber and wool where rubbed together.

Although the design and materials used in capacitors have changed greatly throughout history, the fundamentals remain the same. In general, capacitors are very simple electrical devices which can have many uses in today's technologically advanced world. A modern capacitor usually consists of two conducting plates sandwiched around an insulator. Electrical researcher Nikola Tesla described capacitors as the "electrical equivalent of dynamite".
