= Heavy ion fusion =

Fusion energy concept

Heavy ion fusion is a fusion energy concept that uses a stream of high-energy ions from a particle accelerator to rapidly heat and compress a small pellet of fusion fuel. It is a subclass of the larger inertial confinement fusion (ICF) approach, replacing the more typical laser systems with an accelerator.

Accelerators have the potential to be much more efficient in terms of delivering energy to the fuel pellet; typical laser-based "drivers" have overall efficiency on the order of 1%, while heavy-ion systems aim for 30% or more. Additionally, they can produce pulses of energy many times a second, while existing high-energy laser systems require lengthy cooling periods between "shots". These advantages would be useful in a commercial setting, as they would greatly lower the cost of operation, and somewhat lower the cost of building the plant compared to a laser system.

The basic concept of replacing photon beams with particle beams had been suggested on occasion before 1970, using either electrons or protons. Fundamental limits on the beam focusing and stopping distances using pulsed power acceleration of electrons or protons led to the concept of using heavy ions, whose higher atomic number causes each ion to stop more rapidly in fusion target material, which allows them convey thousands of times electrons or protons with the same stopping range.

The high energy of each ion means a given beam power level will be achieved with less current. Conventional accelerator beams focus to small spots. For example, CERN's Large Hadron Collider started out to hit beams head-on with 250nm focal spot radius, and in routine operation has achieved much better.

The high energy ions need to be in a low charge state to handle space charge forces. Singly ionized ions are strongly favored. The ions have substantial rigidity and do not scatter easily in modest vacuum, allowing the high quality beams focus to small radius spots in inertial fusion reaxtion chambers.

A major meeting in 1976 led to the rapid uptake of the concept through the late 1970s and early 1980s. In the late 1970s, heavy ion fusion (HIF) was described as "the conservative approach" to a working fusion reactor. In the early 1970s, definitive studies showed that inerital fusion chambers can avoid the damage of chamber materials by high energy neutrons from the deuterium-tritium reaction.

Lawrence Livermore National Laboratory (LLNL) confirmed with the 8-yr HYLIFE study (1977-85) that inertial fusion chambers can, because of the neutron protection from injected lithium, be built with "common steels." HYLIFE's highly desirable conclusion required that each pellet yield the energy equivalent of a ton of high explosives, 4 GJ, or more.

Results from the NOVA laser at LLNL in the late 1980s and early 1990s indicated that a laser would not be able to ignite such a large energy release. Livermore conceived an innovative pattern of jets to create the thick liquid wall to work with smaller fusion yields and higher repetition rates, upending HYLIFE's clean design by substituting FLIBE for pure lithium in the 1992-94 HYLIFE-II design [citation].

Since that time, in spite of continued interest, no large-scale experimental device using the approach has been built. It has the disadvantage that accelerators with the required energies can only be built in a large size, on the order of kilometres, which makes it difficult to test with low-cost systems. In contrast, even small lasers can reach the desired conditions, which is why they remain the focus of the ICF approach.

Confidence in ion acclerator system design has historically seen multiple occasions where large, new machines use innovations to increase performance parameters by factors of ten. For this reason, large new machines can be built based on the precedents that reduced new ideas to practice in industrial as well as research accelerator systems.

== Background ==
=== Fusion basics ===
Fusion takes place when atoms come into close proximity and the nuclear force pulls them together to form a single larger nucleus. Counteracting this process is the positive charge of the nuclei, which repel each other due to the electrostatic force. In order for fusion to occur, the nuclei must have enough energy to overcome this coulomb barrier. The barrier is lowered for atoms with less positive charge, those with the fewest protons. The nuclear force is increased with additional nucleons, the total number of protons and neutrons. This means that a combination of deuterium and tritium has the lowest coulomb barrier, at about 100 keV (see requirements for fusion), as they contain a single proton and one or two neutrons.

When the fuel is heated to high energies, the electrons separate from the nuclei, leaving individual ions and electrons mixed in a gas-like plasma. Particles in a gas are distributed across a wide range of energies known as the Maxwell–Boltzmann distribution. At any given temperature the majority of the particles are at lower energies, with a "long tail" containing smaller numbers of particles at much higher energies. So while the 100 keV threshold represents a temperature of over one billion degrees, in order to produce fusion events the fuel does not have to be heated to this temperature as a whole; some reactions will occur at lower bulk temperatures due to the small number of high-energy particles in the mix.

The fusion reactions give off large amounts of energy, and some of that energy will be deposited back in the fuel, heating it. There is a critical temperature at which the rate of reactions, and thus the energy deposited in the fuel, balances losses to the environment through escaping particles and radiation. At this point the reaction becomes self-sustaining, a point known as ignition. For D-T fuel, the self-heating is primary through alpha particles and the corresponding temperature is between 50 and 100 million degrees. The overall rate of fusion is dependent on the combination of temperature, density and energy confinement time, known as the fusion triple product.

=== Fusion reactors ===
Two primary approaches have developed for the fusion energy problem. The most widely studied approach is magnetic confinement. Since the plasma is electrically charged, it will follow magnetic lines of force and a suitable arrangement of fields can keep the fuel away from the container walls. The fuel is then heated over an extended period. At the densities that are possible using magnets, the fusion process is fairly slow, so this approach requires long confinement times on the order of tens of seconds. Confining a gas at millions of degrees for this sort of time scale has proven difficult, although modern experimental machines are approaching the conditions needed for net power production, or breakeven.

The second major approach is inertial confinement. The alphas from the fusion reactions travel a distance that is dependent on the density of the fuel. In the low-densities of a magnetic reactor, often described as "a good vacuum", this may be on the order of many meters, (Note: Although as the alpha are also electrically charged, in magnetic machines, they are captured within the reactor long enough that they will undergo collisions even with a very long mean free path.) but at very high densities this is greatly reduced, down to microns. The inertial approach takes advantage of this effect by compressing the fuel to extremely high density, at which point a tiny drop of fuel on the order of milligrams will be enough to allow ignition. Additionally, the collapse causes the temperature of the fuel to rise through the adiabatic process, providing two of the three inputs of the triple product.

There is no attempt to maintain these conditions for any significant period of time, the fuel explodes outward soon after the driver pulse ends, slowed only by the inertia of the particles. The confinement time is on the order of microseconds, so the temperatures and density have to be very high in order for any appreciable amount of the fuel to undergo fusion. This approach has been successful in producing fusion reactions, but to date, the devices that can provide the compression, typically lasers, require much more energy than the reactions produce.

=== ICF details ===
There are two separate effects in the ICF process, one is to compress the fuel so the alphas are captured within it, and the second is to heat the fuel to the temperatures needed for the reactions to begin. In order to efficiently capture the alphas, a density of about 1000 times that of water is desired, (Note: Or 100 times lead.) which requires a beam energy of about 10^{7} Joules per gram (J/g) of target mass. In contrast, heating the fuel to fusion temperatures requires about 10^{9} J/g. For this reason, effort has been put into ways to separately heat the fuel; the typical solution is to shape the energy delivery to create a brief period of higher energy, creating a shock wave that travels into the compressing fuel. This is known as "hot spot ignition".

Schematic of the stages of ICF. The blue arrows represent the driver; orange is blowoff; purple is inwardly transported thermal energy.: 1. Ions or X-rays rapidly heat the surface of the target, forming a surrounding plasma envelope.; 2. Fuel is compressed by the rocket-like blowoff of the surface and the continuing incoming radiation.; 3. During the final part of the implosion, the core reaches 1000 times the density of water and ignites.; 4. Fusion burn spreads rapidly through the compressed fuel, yielding many times the input energy.

Most ICF systems to date have used lasers as the "driver". In the simple case when the laser is shone directly on the fuel target, known as "direct drive", the heat created by the laser causes the outer layer of the plastic capsule to explode outward. Due to Newton's third law, this causes the interior of the capsule to be driven inward. Direct drive places very strong limits on the focussing and delivery time, and is difficult to achieve. For this reason, most large ICF devices use the "indirect drive" process, in which the driver heats a metal cylinder known as a "hohlraum" so hot that it begins to release X-rays, which in turn shine on a capsule suspended inside. This allows the heating process to take place over a longer period and reduces the need to focus as tightly but has the disadvantage that much of the original beam energy is used to heat the cylinder, and does not contribute to the implosion.

Sankey diagram of the laser energy to hohlraum X-ray to target capsule energy coupling. Note the "laser energy" is after conversion to UV, which loses about 50% of the original IR power. The conversion of X-ray heat to energy in the fuel loses another 90% – of the 1.9 MJ of UV light, only about 10 kJ ends up in the fuel itself.

Delivering a pulse with the required energy levels and timing is a significant challenge. To date, the energy requirements have normally been met using complex neodymium-doped phosphate glass lasers that have an overall efficiency around 1%. Optical systems needed to focus and control the beam remove an additional 50% of the energy, and in the case of indirect drive, significant amounts of what remain are lost heating the metal cylinder. For the National Ignition Facility, the largest and most powerful ICF system to date, only about 10 to 14 kJ of the original 4 MJ of the original laser energy reaches the target, which required 422 MJ of electrical power to generate.

In order for the fusion reactions to produce enough energy to match the original energy of the laser, it will have to produce at least 4 MJ, and for practical reasons, at least three times that, implying the ratio of input laser energy to output fusion energy, (Note: Note that the standard in ICF is to measure the energy of the output of the laser, not the input electricity, so another factor of 100 is required end-to-end.) or gain, has to be on the order of hundreds or thousands. To date, the record on NIF is 1.3 MJ of fusion from 2 MJ of laser output, from 422 MJ of electricity, so it is extremely unlikely the current approach could ever be used for power production.

=== Alternate drivers ===
In 1963, Friedwardt Winterberg introduced the concept of igniting fusion using small groups of particles that have been accelerated to about 200 km/s, a concept that is now known as cluster impact fusion. This concept is not similar to modern ICF, as the accelerated particles are intended to undergo fusion directly, and are not being used solely a driver as in the ICF concept. The publication of several ICF-related papers in the late 1960s prompted Winterberg to publish a 1968 paper outlining the use of accelerated electrons or ions in place of the laser systems in an ICF arrangement.

Al Maschke, working at the Brookhaven National Laboratory's Alternating Gradient Synchrotron (AGS), suggested the use of a proton synchrotron, like the AGS, as the basis for an ICF driver. This could deliver the desired energy with relatively minor upgrades. However, further study demonstrated a problem with this approach; the beam would diverge excessively due to like-charge repulsion and it would be difficult to get the intensity needed for ICF. (Note: The problem was much worse with electrons, to the point of impossibility.) Additionally, the protons would stop within the fuel target at different depths, which would make it difficult to control the implosion dynamics. These problems both led Maschke to suggest, around 1975, the switch from protons to heavier ions, like cesium, xenon, mercury or lead. In early 1976, Dennis Keefe proposed that the linear induction accelerator would work for this purpose.

A significant event in HIF's history was a two-week July 1976 meeting at the Claremont Hotel in Berkeley, California where Maschke’s ideas were studied by around fifty participants from all of the major particle accelerator and fusion labs and universities. Their report on the meeting demonstrated there were no red-flag issues and that that concept's potential suggested a more detailed study. This resulted in several follow-up studies, at Brookhaven in 1977, Argonne in 1978 and Oakland in 1979, (Note: The meetings have continued every other year until 2016.) all with similar promising results. In a May 1979 review of the entire ICF field, John S. Foster Jr. concluded that HIF was the best bet for an ICF fusion reactor "if you wanted to make a conservative approach".

After further wrangling, in 1983 the Department of Energy was finally persuaded to provide some funding to form an official organization to manage these efforts, the Heavy Ion Fusion Accelerator Research program, or HIFAR. Over the next decade, the HIFAR group at Lawrence Berkeley, along with similar groups at Lawrence Livermore and elsewhere, continued studying the basic concept. Studies continued for the next decade, resulting in two proposed complete power plant designs, HYLIFE and HYLIFE-II.

=== Another look ===
During this same period, the classical laser-based approach to ICF suffered a series of significant setbacks. Much of the predicted performance of these designs was based on computer simulations using programs like LASNEX. Early simulations suggested that some fusion gain could be expected even at relatively low beam energies on the order of 10 kJ, but when this prediction was tested in the Shiva system a host of unforeseen issues dramatically lowered the performance by a factor of about 10,000. Updates to LASNEX suggested a larger system with several hundred kJ of power would do it, but the resulting Nova system built to this scale instead demonstrated yet another set of significant problems and once again failed to meet predictions.

Experiments using nuclear weapons as the driver in place of the laser, part of Halite/Centurion, suggested dramatically higher energies were required, perhaps as much as 100 MJ, well beyond the capabilities of any laser system. Even in the best-case scenarios, with various advances in target shaping and timing of the energy pulse, at least 2 MJ would be needed. This would require about 200 MJ of electricity to power the lasers, so fusion gains on the order of Q=100 would be needed for the energy to balance out, even ignoring all the loss mechanisms.

This series of events led to renewed interest in HIF. Because the driver efficiency was so much higher, the required gain was correspondingly lower, on the order of Q=10. Lower gain meant much less demanding implosion dynamics, as well as less powerful explosions which could be contained in a smaller device. Since the late 1990s, a fairly continuous stream of papers on the topic continues to be generated by labs around the world, and some small-scale experimentation on suitable accelerators has been carried out.

=== Current status ===
A practical problem for the HIF approach is the fact that in order to deliver the correct energy and timing the accelerator has to be large. One would desire that most of the ions would stop at about the same location in the target in order to produce a symmetrical effect. To do this, the energy of the ions has to be quite precise. In the case of a commonly used ion type, lead, that energy is about 8 GeV in order to have the ions stop at an average distance of 1 mm while also delivering enough energy to the target. An accelerator capable of giving lead ions this level of energy is neither small nor inexpensive, even for low numbers of ions, making it difficult to produce in a small-scale device.

In contrast, lasers with the required performance can be built at practically any scale. This is the primary reason that HIF has not seen development; the smallest possible machine is still quite large and expensive. For development purposes, lasers would be simpler and less expensive while ultimately working in a similar fashion in terms of implosion physics. That said, as the laser ICF program continued, it has demonstrated that ever-larger drivers are required, culminating in the NIF which, at about 4 billion dollars and the size of two football fields, is neither small nor inexpensive. (Note: One review used scientific notation when describing NIF's price in order to "avoid running out of zeros.")

In 2003, DOE decided to focus all of its ICF efforts on the NIF program as many post-NIF projects would be based on its results. Plans for various smaller test concepts for the HIF program largely ended at that time.

== Description ==
=== Target physics ===
The energy needed to compress an ICF target to the required density is about 10^{7} J/g, so for small amounts of fuel on the order of 1 mg the energy requirement is about 10 kJ. However, additional energy is required to heat the fuel to fusion temperatures, compression alone will not be sufficient until about 10^{9} J/g. This leads to a variety of mechanisms to lower this requirement to about 10^{8} J/g, (Note: Or 4.5 × 10^{7} to be exact.) and thus about 100 kJ in total for 1 mg of fuel. A variety of loss mechanisms during compression loses about 90% of that energy, and thus drivers have to be on the order 1 MJ. (Note: Although, as of 2021, the 4 MJ NIF has failed to come close to ignition, so more might be required.)

In the 1970s when the concept was first being considered, the most powerful accelerators, typically using electron or proton, accelerated small numbers of particles to high energies. Those that could reach 1 MJ generally did so with protons with energies around 20 GeV. These highly relativistic particles pass right through small objects without slowing, making them unsuitable for ICF. A driver would ideally want to use much larger numbers of lower-energy particles that will stop more rapidly. At non-relativistic energies, less than 20 MeV, they have a reasonable chance of stopping in a small object. At these energies, the numbers of particles, or "luminosity", required to deliver the needed energy is well beyond any existing technology.

Moving to heavier particles has some advantage in terms of lowering velocity, as energy = 1/2mv^{2}, but the mass is linear with energy while velocity is a square, so the reduction in velocity is not great. The key advantage is the way that the particles slow within a target. As they pass the atoms in the target, their electrical charge ionizes the target atoms, and it is these interactions that slow the particle in a scattering process known as the Coulomb collision. A curious effect in the Coulomb collision is the Bragg peak, which is caused by the slowing of the ion near the end of its trajectory. This effect means that when ions are shot into a substance, most of them will be deposited at a well-defined distance. For any selected stopping distance and chosen particle energy, a heavy ion will stop in about three orders of magnitude shorter distance than a proton, making the system much easier to arrange.

=== Target design ===
As is the case with laser-driven ICF, HIF can be built using either the direct or indirect drive concepts, and the primary reasons for using one or the other are the same; direct-drive requires much higher beam accuracy of the driver, but delivers about 15% of the energy from the driver to the fuel, while indirect-drive is less critical of beam placement and timing while delivering only about 5% of the energy to the target.

In the indirect drive case, the system is almost identical to that of the laser-driven systems, the differences are mostly in the hohlraum design. In laser devices, the hohlraum are in the form of open cylinders and the laser beams shine in through the ends and onto the inner walls. In the case of an ion driver, the stopping distance would lead to the X-rays being captured inside the hohlraum walls. Instead, the hohlraum is in the form of a thin shell, typically an ovoid, with small metal plates suspended within. The wall of the hohlraum is thin enough to be invisible to the beams, which instead strike the thicker plates, heating until they begin to emit X-rays that fill the shell. The X-rays then cause the fuel capsule to collapse in exactly the same fashion as the laser case. There is one advantage to the HIF driver in this case, however, as it can be quickly oscillated at high frequencies, allowing the beams to be moved within the hohlraum to even out the heating. The formation of hot spots on the hohlraum walls has proven to be an issue in laser devices, which this could avoid.

Because the stopping distance of the ions is on the order of 1 mm, targets for direct-drive HIF are generally larger and much thicker than those in laser systems. A typical design is about 4 mm in radius, with an outer layer of lead or gold, a pusher made of lighter metal like aluminum, and then a thin layer of D-T fuel frozen to the inner layer of the aluminum. The inner core, about 2.8 mm, is empty. Such a design, with higher density on the outside and lighter on the inside, is a formula for Rayleigh-Taylor instability (R-T), so the targets and illumination must be extremely uniform. Considerations of the illumination suggest 16 to 32 beams are required. Some capsule designs add a thin layer of foam to buffer the compression to reduce R-T.

A significant problem in early ICF systems was that the laser pulses were roughly uniform in time. It was found that this deposited energy more rapidly than it could be absorbed by the capsule, leading to the fuel being heated instead of simply pushed. This led to the modern concept of the "foot", an initial period of much lower energy that begins the driver process while avoiding pre-heating, and then the "main pulse" that follows near the end of the process that drives the final high-compression stage. Because of the mass of the pusher layer, the entire process is slower than in laser systems, with the pulse as a whole lasting about 35 ns, compared to perhaps 1/3 that for laser pulses.

=== Driver designs ===
Animation showing how an RF accelerator works. The graph V(x) shows the electrical potential along the axis of the accelerator at each point in time. The polarity of the RF voltage reverses as the ion passes through each electrode, so that the electric field (arrows) has the correct direction to accelerate it. The animation shows a single particle being accelerated each cycle; in HIF a large number of particles are injected and accelerated each cycle.

There are two main design concepts for the driver systems, with US teams concentrating on induction accelerators and European and Japanese teams on radio-frequency accelerators.

RF accelerators consist of a pipe with periodic gaps in it, each of them enclosed in a resonant cavity. When a radio frequency signal is applied across the gap, each one begins to resonate at a chosen frequency. This produces an electric force across the gap that accelerates the ions along the pipe. The signal is timed so that it reaches a peak as a group of ions passes. This means it can only accelerate short pulses of ions, and therefore requires some way to combine the pulses back together.

Induction accelerators consist of a series of solenoids spaced out along the beamline. Each is powered as the ions pass it, accelerating them. This has the advantage of allowing the accelerators to be wrapped around multiple beamlines, accelerating them all at the same time.

In either case, the need for very large beam power in very short pulses, along with the need to focus those beams down to about 3 mm, demands a number of new design factors. In order to meet the focussing requirement, the initial ion source must have a very low emittance, the spread of the ions in space and velocity. This is essentially a measure of their random motion when created, which is a function of their temperature. To provide the desired emittance, new low-temperature injectors have to be developed.

The ion's positive electric charge forces them away from each other over time, leading to the concept of the space charge limit, the maximum number of ions in a given volume that can remain focused. This value is far below the requirements to produce a pulse that will compress the target. US designs approach this problem by having a large number of parallel beam lines that combine just as they approach the target chamber. European designs favor the use of storage rings for this role. In both cases, an initial long pulse of ions is reduced in length to produce an ever-shorter pulse. For instance, in one US design the initial pulse is 27 μs long, and undergoes repeated compression until it is only 10 ns.

In any version, the resulting designs are very long. US illustrations generally use a folded beamline that is shaped like a U, with a total length on the order of 1 kilometre (0.62 mi). This is the HIF approach's major downside; although it is possible to build an accelerator with less beam current for testing purposes, the individual ions still require the same energy and thus the accelerator will be a similar size as a higher-current version for a production reactor.

=== Advantages over lasers ===
There are significant practical advantages to the use of ions over lasers. To start with, lasers that can reach the desired energy levels are extremely inefficient, on the order of 1% of the electricity supplied to them ends up as photons in the beam. In contrast, HIF drivers put perhaps 30 to 40% of the input energy into the beam. This significantly eases the required performance of the targets if the goal is to produce net energy output; a 4 MJ laser requires approximately 400 MJ of electrical energy, and considering a modern Rankine cycle generator is about 40% efficient, the output from the capsule must be at least about 1 GJ to recharge the laser. In contrast, the same 4 MJ beam energy could be produced by 10 MJ HIF driver, requiring about 40 MJ of fusion output, a dramatically simpler goal. Considering additional losses in the process, HIF devices generally target gain on the order of 50 to 70.

Another significant advantage for the HIF design is its ability to rapidly fire in succession. The glass systems used in lasers are heated by the passage of the beam, causing them to swell and become defocussed, requiring some time to cool before they can be used again. In practice, this limits devices like NIF to perhaps a few "shots" a day, and while this can be increased through the use of advanced cooling systems, these might reduce the firing times to minutes or perhaps tens of seconds. In contrast, HIFs have no in-line focussing or beam control components, all of that is handled by magnets surrounding the beamlines. This allows them to fire continually, and rates of 10 to 15 shots per second seem possible. This is an enormous advantage in the case of an operational plant where the shot timing should be quick enough so that the output looks relatively continual.

The ability to control the beam electrically offers significant operational advantages. Small scale beam steering, or "wobbling", is useful during the pulse to smooth out the energy. On a longer time frame, the continual motion of the device due to sagging and seismic events has to be accounted for over the long travel distances of the beams. In a laser system, this requires a lengthy recalibration effort, whereas this can be performed easily, and perhaps continually, in the HIF case through minor changes of the fields in the final steering magnets. This can also be used to steer the beams between completely different reaction chambers, which offers fail-over operations and the ability to fire into different chambers in succession if the desired pulse rate is faster than any one chamber can be cleared.

Finally, the final optics where the laser enters the reaction chamber is subject to the direct output of the fusion events, including high-energy neutrons and various other particles and radiation. This leads to constant erosion of the windows, which can cause significant problems with the high-energy light. This has emerged as a significant problem in laser-driven ICF devices. HIF's ability to be easily steered offers a number of simple solutions to these problems, allowing the beamlines to be isolated from the reactions using rotating mechanical shutters or other concepts.

== Economics ==
Several design studies were published through the 1990s and into the 2000s, aided by ever-better simulations of the ICF process as well as continued improvements in accelerator design. A high point was the October 1990 publication of the HYLIFE-II design study for a HIF power plant using molten flibe to protect the walls of the reaction chamber as well as breed tritium for fuel. The baseline 1 GWe design resulted in an expected levelized cost of electricity (LCOE) of 9 cents/kWh in 1988 dollars, or equivalent to $0.25 in 2025. This was not a competitive figure even at that time, (Note: The design paper puts this at double the cost of contemporary sources, then states those prices as 4 cents for coal and 5 for light water reactors.) and the system only became competitive when the reactor scaled up to a very large 2 GWe size, which would significantly limit its commercial applicability. The paper concludes:

To be competitive with future coal and LWR nuclear power, the cost of electricity needs to be reduced by a factor of 2.

A more modern review comes to the same conclusion:

Finally, research aimed at cost reduction is critically important.
