= Z Pulsed Power Facility =

World's largest pulsed power facility

Coordinates: 35.035451°N 106.542522°W

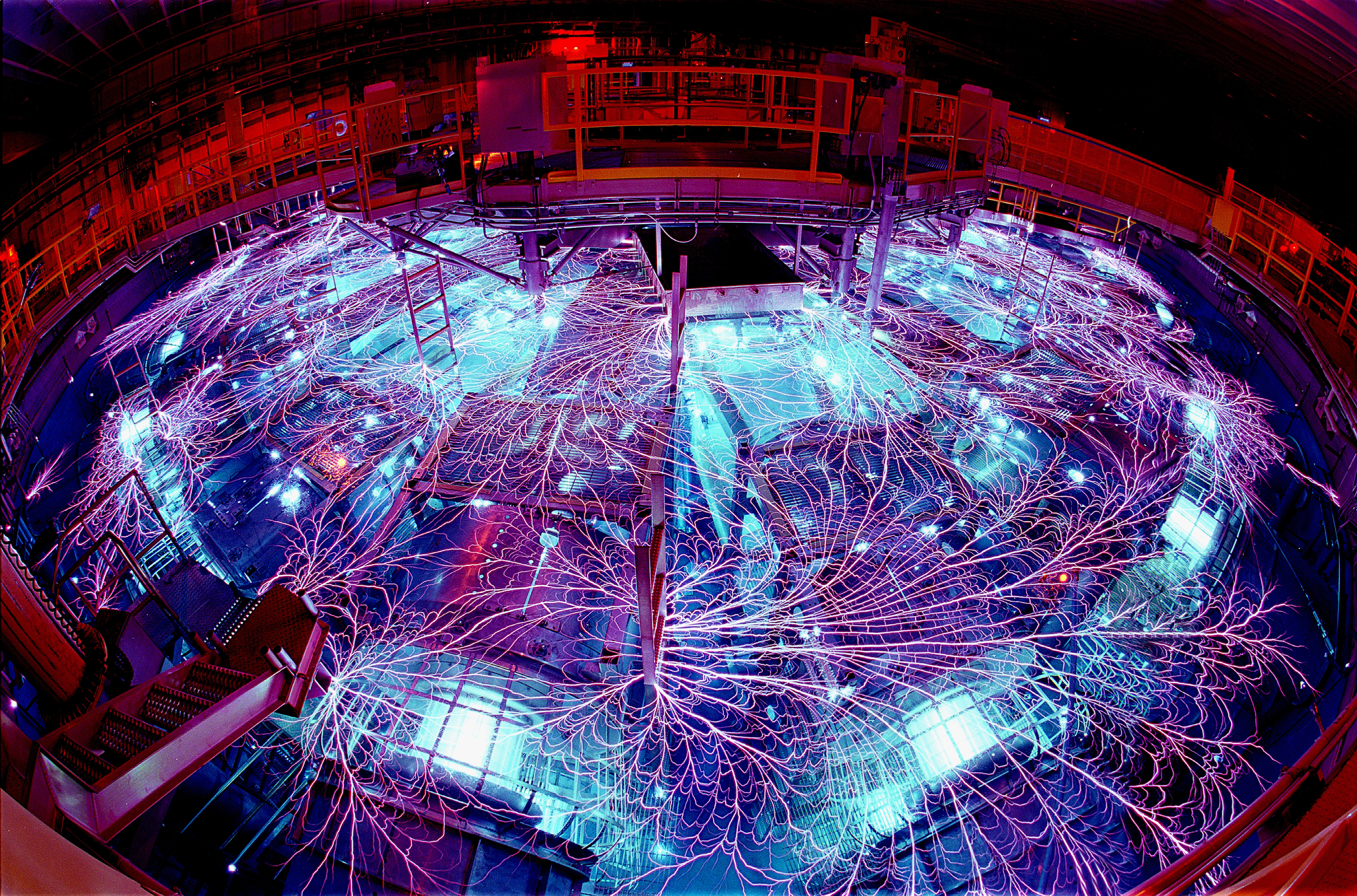
Overhead view from a fisheye lens of the Z machine at Sandia National Laboratory. Due to the extremely high voltage, the power feeding equipment is submerged in concentric chambers of 2 megalitres (2,000 m^{3}) of transformer oil and 2.3 megalitres (2,300 m^{3}) of deionized water, which act as insulators. Nevertheless, the electromagnetic pulse when the machine is discharged causes impressive lightning, referred to as a "flashover", which can be seen around many of the metallic objects in the machine.

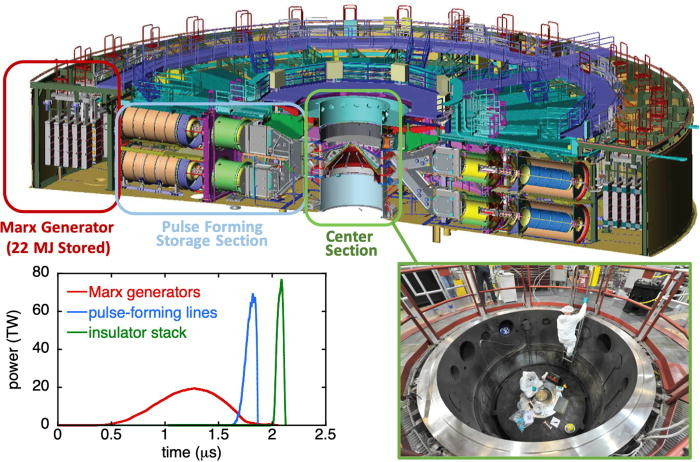
Z machine cross section

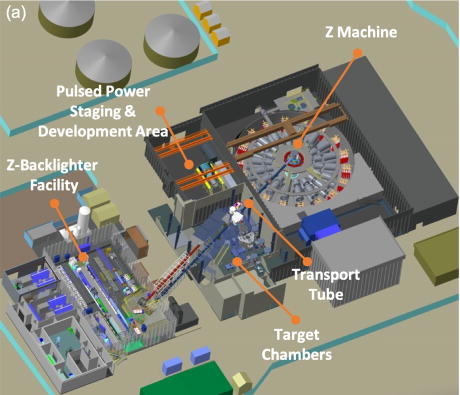
Z machine diagram

The Z Pulsed Power Facility, informally known as the Z machine or simply Z, is the largest high frequency electromagnetic wave generator in the world, operated by Sandia National Laboratories in Albuquerque, New Mexico.

It has primarily been used as an inertial confinement fusion (ICF) research facility, including the magnetized liner inertial fusion (MagLIF) approach, and for testing materials in conditions of extreme temperature and pressure. In particular, it gathers data to aid in computer modeling of nuclear weapons and eventual fusion pulsed power plants.

== History ==
The Z machine's origins can be traced to the Department of Energy (DoE) needing to replicate the fusion reactions of a thermonuclear bomb in a lab environment to better understand the physics involved. Since the 1970s, the DoE has also been looking into ways to generate electricity from fusion reactions.

The first research at Sandia, headed by Gerold Yonas – the particle-beam fusion program – dates back to 1971. This program tried to generate fusion by compressing fuel with beams of charged particles. Electrons were the first particles to be thought of, because the pulsed power accelerators at the time had already concentrated them at high power in small areas. However, shortly thereafter it was realized that electrons can not possibly heat the fusion fuel rapidly enough for the purpose. The program then moved away from electrons in favor of protons. These turned out to be too light to control well enough to concentrate onto a target, and the program moved on to light ions, lithium. The accelerators names reflect the change in emphasis: first the accelerator's name was EBFA-I (electron beam fusion accelerator), shortly thereafter PBFA-I, which became Saturn. Protons demanded another accelerator, PBFA-II, which became Z.

The November 1978 issue of Scientific American carried Yonas' first general-public article, "Fusion power with particle beams".

In 1985, the PBFA-II was created. Sandia continued to target heavy ion fusion at a slow pace despite the National Academies report.

Meanwhile, defense-related research was also ongoing at Sandia with the Hermes III machine and Saturn (1987), upgraded from PBFA-I, which operated at lower total power than PBFA-II but advanced Sandia's knowledge in high voltage and high current and was therefore a useful predecessor to the Z machine.

Also in 1996, the PBFA-II machine was once again upgraded into PBFA-Z or simply "Z machine", described for the first time to the general public in August 1998 in Scientific American.

== Physics of the Z machine ==
The stages of a typical MagLIF implosion at Z.: 1. A laser preheats the fuel.; 2. An axial current is driven through the liner.; 3. The current induces an azimuthal magnetic field.; 4. The magnetic force implodes the liner, compressing and further heating the fuel.

The Z machine uses the well known principle of Z-pinch to produce hot short-lived plasmas. The plasma can be used as a source of x-rays, as a surrogate for the inside of a thermonuclear weapon, or as a surrogate for the core of a fusion power plant.

In a Z-pinch, the fast discharge of current through a column of plasma causes it to be compressed towards its axis by the resulting Lorentz forces, thus heating it. Willard Harrison Bennett successfully researched the application of Z-pinches to plasma compression. The Z machine layout is cylindrical. On the outside it houses huge capacitors discharging through Marx generators which generate a one microsecond high-voltage pulse. This pulse is then compressed by a factor of 10 to enable the creation of 100 ns discharges.

Most experiments on the Z machine run the current discharge through a conductive tube (called a liner) filled with gas. This approach is known as magnetized liner inertial fusion, or MagLIF. The compression of a MagLIF Z-pinch is limited because the current flow is highly unstable and rotates along the cylinder which causes twisting of the imploding tube therefore decreasing the quality of the compression.

The Z machine has also conducted experiments with arrays of tungsten wires rather than liners. The space inside the wire array was filled with polystyrene, which helps homogenize the X-ray flux. By removing the polystyrene core, Sandia was able to obtain a thin 1.5 mm plasma cord in which 10 million amperes flowed with 90 megabars of pressure.

== Early operation 1996–2006 ==
The key attributes of Sandia's Z machine are its 18 million amperes of current and a discharge time of less than 100 nanoseconds. This current discharge was initially run through an array of tungsten wires. In 1999, Sandia tested the idea of nested wire arrays; the second array, out of phase with the first, compensates for Rayleigh-Taylor instabilities. In 2001, Sandia introduced the Z-Beamlet laser (from surplus equipment of the National Ignition Facility) as a tool to better image the compressing pellet. This confirmed the shaping uniformity of pellets compressed by the Z machine.

In 1999, Sandia started the Z-inertial fusion energy (Z-IFE) project, which aimed to solve the practical difficulties in harnessing fusion power. Major problems included producing energy in a single Z-pinch shot, and quickly reloading the reactor after each shot. By their early estimates, an implosion of a fuel capsule every 10 seconds could economically produce 300 MW of fusion energy.

Sandia announced the fusing of small amounts of deuterium in the Z machine on April 7, 2003.

Besides being used as an X-ray generator, the Z machine propelled small plates at 34 kilometers a second, faster than the 30 kilometers per second that Earth travels in its orbit around the Sun, and four times Earth's escape velocity (3 times it at sea level). It also successfully created a special, hyperdense "hot ice" known as ice VII, by quickly compressing water to pressures of 70,000 to 120,000 atmospheres (7 to 12 GPa). Mechanical shock from impacting Z-machine accelerated projectiles is able to melt diamonds.

During this period the power of X-ray produced jumped from 10 to 300 TW. In order to target the next milestone of fusion breakeven, another upgrade was then necessary.

== After refurbishment (2007–) ==
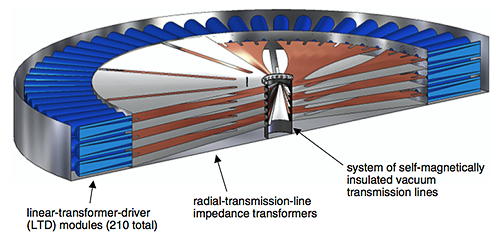
Proposed model of a 1 petawatt LTD-based z-pinch accelerator. 104 m diameter, 70 megaamperes, 24 megavolts.

A $60 million (raised to $90 million) retrofit program called ZR (Z Refurbished) was announced in 2004 to increase its power by 50%. The Z machine was dismantled in July 2006 for this upgrade, including the installation of newly designed hardware and components and more powerful Marx generators. The deionized water section of the machine has been reduced to about half the previous size while the oil section has been expanded significantly in order to house larger intermediate storage lines (i-stores) and new laser towers, which used to sit in the water section. The refurbishment was completed in October 2007. The newer Z machine can now shoot around 26 million amperes (instead of 18 million amperes previously) in 95 nanoseconds. The radiated power has been raised to 350 terawatts and the X-ray energy output to 2.7 megajoules. In 2006 wire array experiments reached ultra-high temperatures of 2.66 to 3.7 billion kelvins.

Sandia's roadmap for the future includes another Z machine version called ZN (Z Neutron) to test higher yields in fusion power and automation systems. ZN is planned to give between 20 and 30 MJ of hydrogen fusion power with a shot per hour using a Russian Linear Transformer Driver (LTD) replacing the current Marx generators. After 8 to 10 years of operation, ZN would become a transmutation pilot plant capable of a fusion shot every 100 seconds.

The next step planned would be the Z-inertial fusion energy (Z-IFE) test facility, the first true z-pinch driven prototype fusion power plant. It is suggested it would integrate Sandia's latest designs using LTDs. Sandia Labs recently proposed a conceptual 1 petawatt (10^{15} W) LTD Z-pinch power plant, where the electric discharge would reach 70 million amperes. As of 2012, fusion shot simulations at 60 to 70 million amperes are showing a 100- to 1000-fold return on input energy. Tests at the Z machine's current design maximum of 26-27 million amperes were set to begin in 2013.

In 2023, the Z machine was used to study the effects of X-rays on simulated asteroid material as part of a planetary defense effort. The experiment was done to assess the feasibility of using a nuclear weapon's X-rays for diverting asteroids found to be on a collision course with Earth.

== Z Fundamental Science Program ==
In 2010, Sandia National Laboratories established the Z Fundamental Science Program (ZFS) to provide access to the Z Machine and its diagnostics to researchers from academia, national labs, and private industry. Up to 10% of the total annual shots on the Z Machine are awarded through this program via an annual call for proposals, corresponding to approximately 10 external user shots per year.

An annual workshop held in Albuquerque, New Mexico convenes the teams conducting experiments through the ZFS program to update the user community on research outcomes and progress.

To date, users have conducted experiments on high-energy-density physics, laboratory astrophysics, planetary science, dynamic compression of materials, and magnetohydrodynamics (MHD) including magnetic reconnection, the evolution of collisionless shocks, and the formation of magnetized jets.

== See also ==
- Stockpile stewardship
- Pulsed power
- Inertial fusion power plant
- Magnetized liner inertial fusion
