= Electromagnetic pulse =

Burst of electromagnetic energy

An electromagnetic pulse (EMP), also referred to as a transient electromagnetic disturbance (TED), is a brief burst of electromagnetic energy. The origin of an EMP can be natural or artificial, and can occur as an electromagnetic field, as a magnetic field, or as a conducted electric current. The electromagnetic interference caused by an EMP can disrupt communications and damage electronic equipment. An EMP such as a lightning strike can physically damage objects such as buildings and aircraft. The management of EMP effects is a branch of electromagnetic compatibility (EMC) engineering. EMP can also be generated by homemade devices, and Tesla coils can often generate such. This is often related to high-energy static electricity.

The solar storm of August 1859, known as the Carrington Event, is historically significant as the first major recorded instance of geomagnetic damage to electrical infrastructure, though it is physically classified as a long-duration geomagnetic disturbance (GMD) rather than a transient electromagnetic pulse (EMP).

In modern warfare, weapons delivering a high energy EMP are designed to disrupt communications equipment, computers needed to operate modern warplanes, or even put the entire electrical network of a target country out of commission. Nuclear weapons produce nuclear electromagnetic pulses; most references to EMP threats regard high-altitude nuclear EMPs.

== General characteristics ==
An electromagnetic pulse is a short surge of electromagnetic energy. Its short duration means that it will be spread over a range of frequencies. Pulses are typically characterized by:

- The mode of energy transfer (electric, magnetic, radiated or conducted)
- The range or spectrum of frequencies present
- Pulse waveform: shape, duration and amplitude

The frequency spectrum and the pulse waveform are interrelated via the Fourier transform which describes how component waveforms may sum to the observed frequency spectrum.

=== Types of energy ===
EMP energy may be transferred in any of four forms:

- Electric field
- Magnetic field
- Electromagnetic radiation
- Electrical conduction

According to Maxwell's equations, a pulse of electric energy will always be accompanied by a pulse of magnetic energy. In a typical pulse, either the electric or the magnetic form will dominate. It can be shown that the non-linear Maxwell's equations can have time-dependent self-similar electromagnetic shock wave solutions where the electric and the magnetic field components have a discontinuity.

In general, only radiation acts over long distances, with the magnetic and electric fields acting over short distances. There are a few exceptions, such as a solar magnetic flare.

=== Frequency ranges ===
A pulse of electromagnetic energy typically comprises many frequencies from very low to some upper limit depending on the source. The range defined as EMP, sometimes referred to as "DC [direct current] to daylight", excludes the highest frequencies comprising the optical (infrared, visible, ultraviolet) and ionizing (X and gamma rays) ranges.

Some types of EMP events can leave an optical trail, such as lightning and sparks, but these are side effects of the current flow through the air and are not part of the EMP itself.

=== Pulse waveforms ===
The waveform of a pulse describes how its instantaneous amplitude (field strength or current) changes over time. Real pulses tend to be quite complicated, so simplified models are often used. Such a model is typically described either in a diagram or as a mathematical equation.

Rectangular pulse	Double exponential pulse	Damped sinewave pulse

Most electromagnetic pulses have a very sharp leading edge, building up quickly to their maximum level. The classic model is a double-exponential curve which climbs steeply, quickly reaches a peak and then decays more slowly. However, pulses from a controlled switching circuit often approximate the form of a rectangular or "square" pulse.

EMP events usually induce a corresponding signal in the surrounding environment or material. Coupling usually occurs most strongly over a relatively narrow frequency band, leading to a characteristic damped sine wave. Visually it is shown as a high frequency sine wave growing and decaying within the longer-lived envelope of the double-exponential curve. A damped sinewave typically has much lower energy and a narrower frequency spread than the original pulse, due to the transfer characteristic of the coupling mode. In practice, EMP test equipment often injects these damped sinewaves directly rather than attempting to recreate the high-energy threat pulses.

In a pulse train, such as from a digital clock circuit, the waveform is repeated at regular intervals. A single complete pulse cycle is sufficient to characterise such a regular, repetitive train.

== Types ==
An EMP arises where the source emits a short-duration pulse of energy. The energy is usually broadband by nature, although it often excites a relatively narrow-band damped sine wave response in the surrounding environment. Some types are generated as repetitive and regular pulse trains.

Different types of EMP arise from natural, man-made, and weapons effects.

Types of natural EMP events include:

- Lightning electromagnetic pulse (LEMP). The discharge is typically an initial current flow of perhaps millions of amps, followed by a train of pulses of decreasing energy.
- Electrostatic discharge (ESD), as a result of two charged objects coming into proximity or even contact.
- Meteoric EMP. The discharge of electromagnetic energy resulting from either the impact of a meteoroid with a spacecraft or the explosive breakup of a meteoroid passing through the Earth's atmosphere.
- Coronal mass ejection (CME), sometimes referred to as a solar EMP. A burst of plasma and accompanying magnetic field, ejected from the solar corona and released into the solar wind.

Types of (civil) man-made EMP events include:

- Switching action of electrical circuitry, whether isolated or repetitive (as a pulse train).
- Electric motors can create a train of pulses as the internal electrical contacts make and break connections as the armature rotates.
- Gasoline engine ignition systems can create a train of pulses as the spark plugs are energized or fired.
- Continual switching actions of digital electronic circuitry.
- Power line surges. These can be up to several kilovolts, enough to damage electronic equipment that is insufficiently protected.

Types of military EMP include:

- Nuclear electromagnetic pulse (NEMP), as a result of a nuclear explosion. A variant of this is the high altitude nuclear EMP (HEMP), which produces a secondary pulse due to particle interactions with the Earth's atmosphere and magnetic field.
- Non-nuclear electromagnetic pulse (NNEMP) weapons.

=== Lightning electromagnetic pulse (LEMP) ===
Lightning is unusual in that it typically has a preliminary "leader" discharge of low energy building up to the main pulse, which in turn may be followed at intervals by several smaller bursts.

=== Electrostatic discharge (ESD) ===
ESD events are characterized by high voltages of many kV, but small currents sometimes cause visible sparks. ESD is treated as a small, localized phenomenon, although technically a lightning flash is a very large ESD event. ESD can also be man-made, as in the shock received from a Van de Graaff generator.

An ESD event can damage electronic circuitry by injecting a high-voltage pulse, besides giving people an unpleasant shock. Such an ESD event can also create sparks, which may in turn ignite fires or fuel-vapour explosions. For this reason, before refueling an aircraft or exposing any fuel vapor to the air, the fuel nozzle is first connected to the aircraft to safely discharge any static.

=== Switching pulses ===
The switching action of an electrical circuit creates a sharp change in the flow of electricity. This sharp change is a form of EMP.

Simple electrical sources include inductive loads such as relays, solenoids, and brush contacts in electric motors. These typically send a pulse down any electrical connections present, as well as radiating a pulse of energy. The amplitude is usually small and the signal may be treated as "noise" or "interference". The switching off or "opening" of a circuit causes an abrupt change in the current flowing. This can in turn cause a large pulse in the electric field across the open contacts, causing arcing and damage. It is often necessary to incorporate design features to limit such effects.

Electronic devices such as vacuum tubes or valves, transistors, and diodes can also switch on and off very quickly, causing similar issues. One-off pulses may be caused by solid-state switches and other devices used only occasionally. However, the many millions of transistors in a modern computer may switch repeatedly at frequencies above 1 GHz, causing interference that appears to be continuous.

=== Nuclear electromagnetic pulse (NEMP) ===
A nuclear electromagnetic pulse is the abrupt pulse of electromagnetic radiation resulting from a nuclear explosion. The resulting rapidly changing electric fields and magnetic fields may couple with electrical/electronic systems to produce damaging current and voltage surges.

The intense gamma radiation emitted can also ionize the surrounding air, creating a secondary EMP as the atoms of air first lose their electrons and then regain them.

NEMP weapons are designed to maximize such EMP effects as the primary damage mechanism, and some are capable of destroying susceptible electronic equipment over a wide area.

A high-altitude electromagnetic pulse (HEMP) weapon is a NEMP warhead designed to be detonated far above the Earth's surface. The explosion releases a blast of gamma rays into the mid-stratosphere, which ionizes as a secondary effect and the resultant energetic free electrons interact with the Earth's magnetic field to produce a much stronger EMP than is normally produced in the denser air at lower altitudes.

=== Non-nuclear electromagnetic pulse (NNEMP) ===
Non-nuclear electromagnetic pulse (NNEMP) is a weapon-generated electromagnetic pulse without use of nuclear technology. Devices that can achieve this objective include a large low-inductance capacitor bank discharged into a single-loop antenna, a microwave generator, and an explosively pumped flux compression generator. To achieve the frequency characteristics of the pulse needed for optimal coupling into the target, wave-shaping circuits or microwave generators are added between the pulse source and the antenna. Vircators are vacuum tubes that are particularly suitable for microwave conversion of high-energy pulses.

NNEMP generators can be carried as a payload of bombs, cruise missiles (such as the CHAMP missile) and drones, with diminished mechanical, thermal and ionizing radiation effects, but without the consequences of deploying nuclear weapons.

The range of NNEMP weapons is much less than nuclear EMP. Nearly all NNEMP devices used as weapons require chemical explosives as their initial energy source, producing only one millionth the energy of nuclear explosives of similar weight. The electromagnetic pulse from NNEMP weapons must come from within the weapon, while nuclear weapons generate EMP as a secondary effect. These facts limit the range of NNEMP weapons, but allow finer target discrimination. The effect of small e-bombs has proven to be sufficient for certain terrorist or military operations. Examples of such operations include the destruction of electronic control systems critical to the operation of many ground vehicles and aircraft.

The concept of the explosively pumped flux compression generator for generating a non-nuclear electromagnetic pulse was conceived as early as 1951 by Andrei Sakharov in the Soviet Union, but nations kept work on non-nuclear EMP classified until similar ideas emerged in other nations.

== Effects ==
Minor EMP events, and especially pulse trains, cause low levels of electrical noise or interference which can affect the operation of susceptible devices. For example, a common problem in the mid-twentieth century was interference emitted by the ignition systems of gasoline engines, which caused radio sets to crackle and TV sets to show stripes on the screen. CISPR 25 was established to set threshold standards that vehicles must meet for electromagnetic interference (EMI) emissions.

At a high voltage level an EMP can induce a spark, for example from an electrostatic discharge when fuelling a gasoline-engined vehicle. Such sparks have been known to cause fuel-air explosions and precautions must be taken to prevent them.

A large and energetic EMP can induce high currents and voltages in the victim unit, temporarily disrupting its function or even permanently damaging it.

A powerful EMP can also directly affect magnetic materials and corrupt the data stored on media such as magnetic tape and computer hard drives. Hard drives are usually shielded by heavy metal casings. Some IT asset disposal service providers and computer recyclers use a controlled EMP to wipe such magnetic media.

A very large EMP event, such as a lightning strike or an air bursted nuclear weapon, is also capable of damaging objects such as trees, buildings and aircraft directly, either through heating effects or the disruptive effects of the very large magnetic field generated by the current. An indirect effect can be electrical fires caused by heating. Most engineered structures and systems require some form of protection against lightning to be designed in. A good means of protection is a Faraday shield designed to protect certain items from being destroyed.

== Control ==
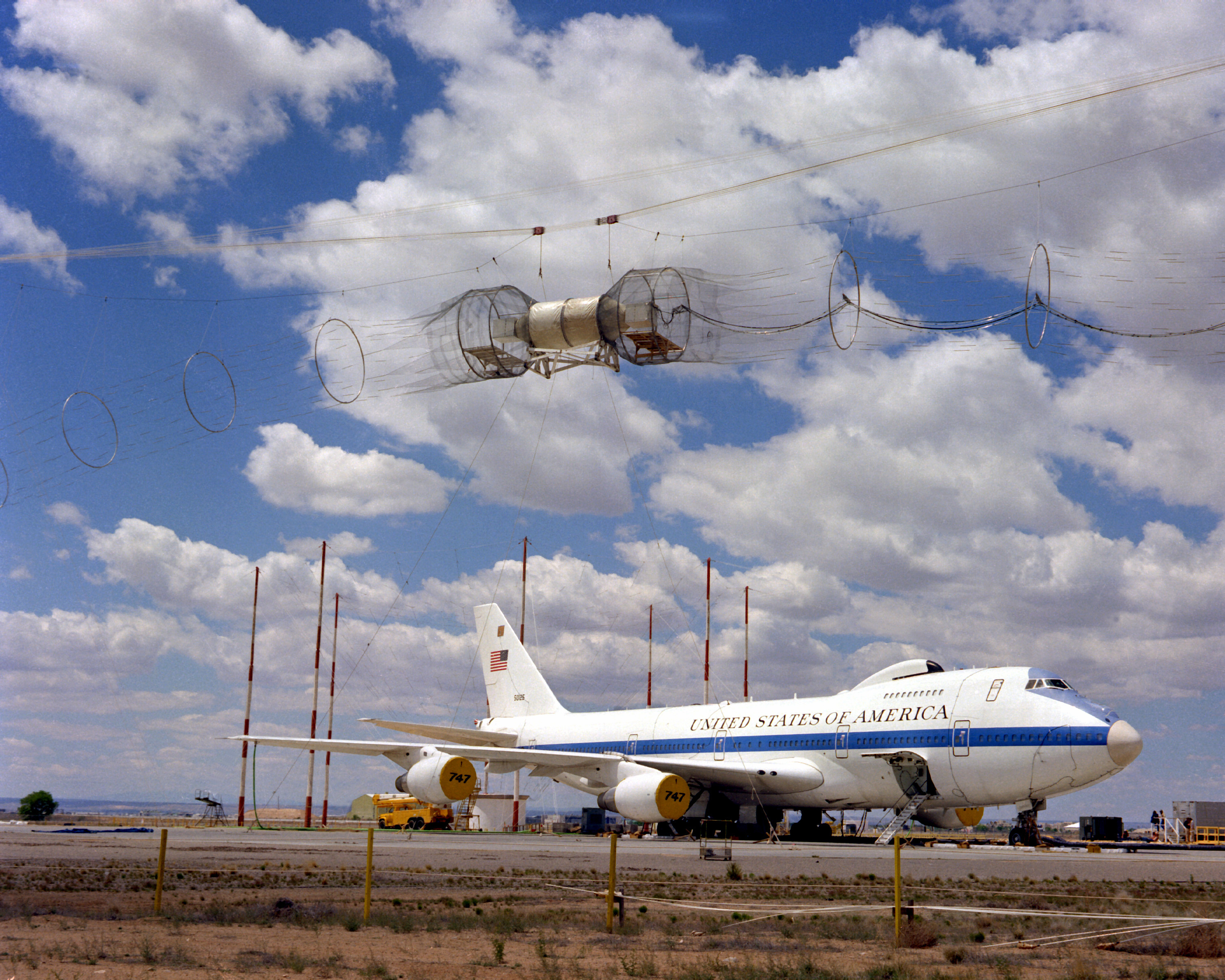
EMP simulator HAGII-C testing a Boeing E-4 aircraft.

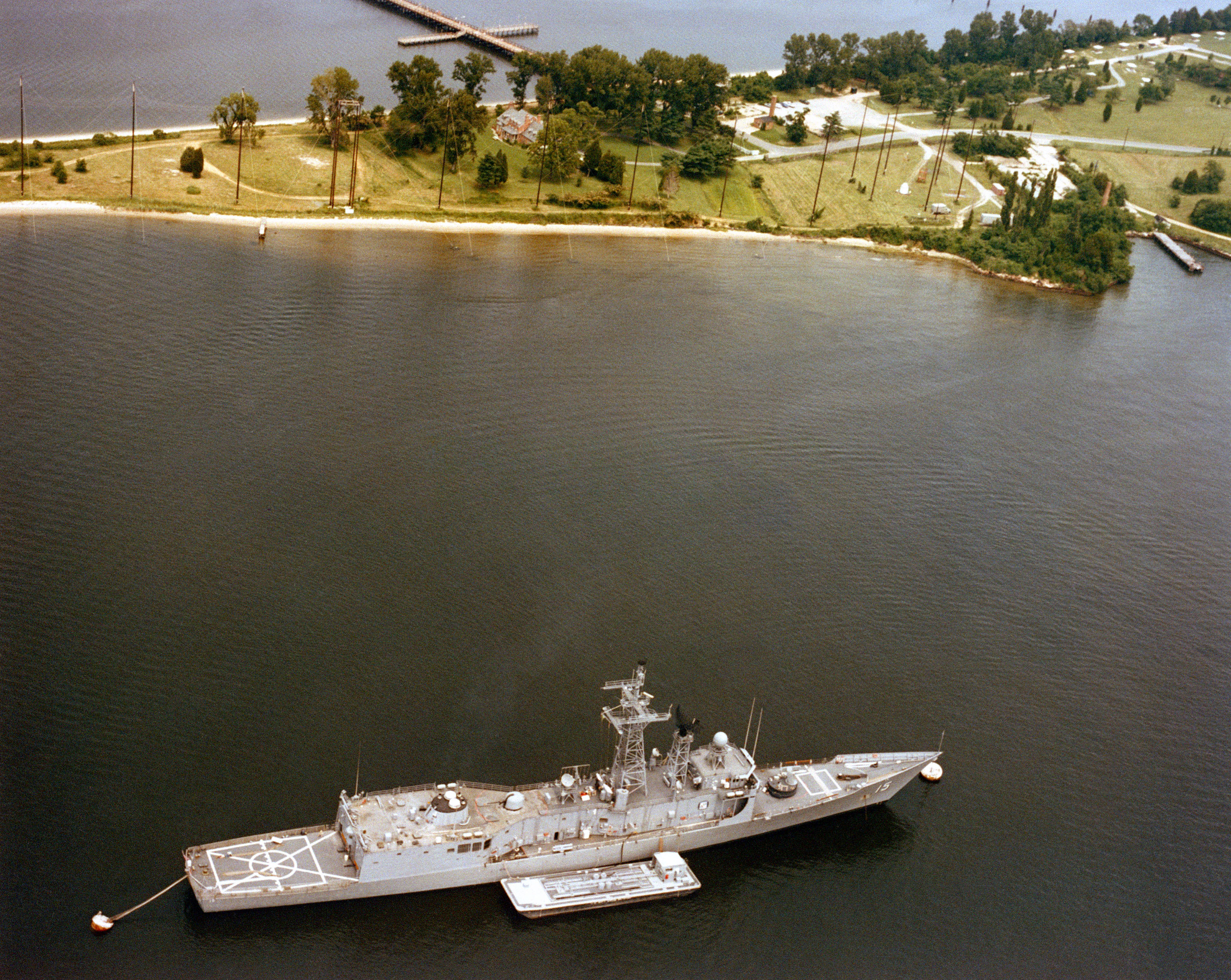
EMPRESS I (antennas along shoreline) with USS Estocin (FFG-15) moored in the foreground for testing.

Like any electromagnetic interference, the threat from EMP is subject to control measures. This is true whether the threat is natural or man-made.

Therefore, most control measures focus on the susceptibility of equipment to EMP effects, and hardening or protecting it from harm. Man-made sources, other than weapons, are also subject to control measures in order to limit the amount of pulse energy emitted.

The discipline of ensuring correct equipment operation in the presence of EMP and other RF threats is known as electromagnetic compatibility (EMC).

=== Test simulation ===
To test the effects of EMP on engineered systems and equipment, an EMP simulator may be used.

==== Induced pulse simulation ====
Induced pulses are of much lower energy than threat pulses and so are more practicable to create, but they are less predictable. A common test technique is to use a current clamp in reverse, to inject a range of damped sine wave signals into a cable connected to the equipment under test. The damped sine wave generator is able to reproduce the range of induced signals likely to occur.

==== Threat pulse simulation ====
Sometimes the threat pulse itself is simulated in a repeatable way. The pulse may be reproduced at low energy in order to characterise the subject's response prior to damped sinewave injection, or at high energy to recreate the actual threat conditions. A small-scale ESD simulator may be hand-held. Bench- or room-sized simulators come in a range of designs, depending on the type and level of threat to be generated.

At the top end of the scale, large outdoor test facilities incorporating high-energy EMP simulators have been built by several countries. The largest facilities are able to test whole vehicles including ships and aircraft for their susceptibility to EMP. Nearly all of these large EMP simulators used a specialized version of a Marx generator. Examples include the huge wooden-structured ATLAS-I simulator (also known as TRESTLE) at Sandia National Labs, New Mexico, which was at one time the world's largest EMP simulator. Papers on this and other large EMP simulators used by the United States during the latter part of the Cold War, along with more general information about electromagnetic pulses, are now in the care of the SUMMA Foundation, which is hosted at the University of New Mexico. The US Navy also has a large facility called the Electro Magnetic Pulse Radiation Environmental Simulator for Ships I (EMPRESS I).

== Safety ==
High-energy EMP signals can pose a threat to human safety. In such circumstances, direct contact with a live electrical conductor should be avoided. Where this occurs, such as when touching a Van de Graaff generator or other highly charged object, care must be taken to release the object and then discharge the body through a high resistance, in order to avoid the risk of a harmful shock pulse when stepping away.

Very high electric field strengths can cause breakdown of the air and a potentially lethal arc current similar to lightning to flow, but electric field strengths of up to 200 kV/m are regarded as safe.

== In popular culture ==
By 1981, a number of articles on electromagnetic pulse in the popular press spread knowledge of the EMP phenomenon into the popular culture. EMP has been subsequently used in a wide variety of fiction and other aspects of popular culture. Popular media often depict EMP effects incorrectly, causing misunderstandings among the public and even professionals. Common misconceptions include that all moving vehicles will stop working, or even that all forms of electronics will fail. Official efforts have been made in the U.S. to remedy these misconceptions.

== See also ==
- Directed-energy weapon
- Electromagnetic compatibility
- Electromagnetic environment
- Electronic warfare
- Explosively pumped flux compression generator
- Faraday's law of induction
- Geomagnetic storm
- Graphite bomb
- MIL-STD-461, a United States Military Standard that describes how to test equipment for electromagnetic compatibility
- Operation Outward
- Pulsed power
- Transient (oscillation)
- Ultrashort pulse
- Vircator
