= Vircator =

Type of microwave generator

A vircator (VIRtual CAthode oscillaTOR) is a microwave generator that is capable of generating brief pulses of tunable, narrow band microwaves at very high power levels. Its application is mainly in the area of electronic warfare, by way of interfering with electronic equipment such as radars or radio equipment.

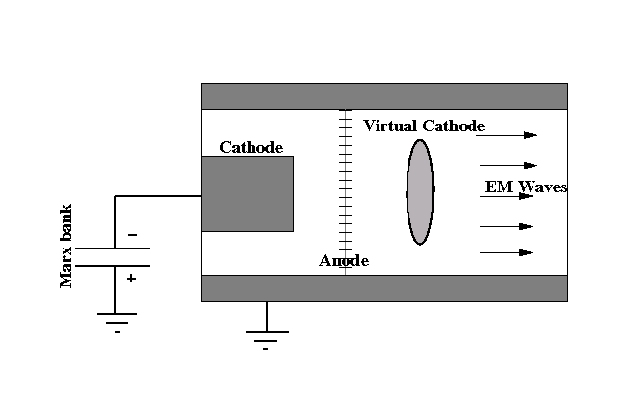
Vircator schematic

A typical vircator is built inside an evacuated resonant cavity or waveguide. An electrode, a cold cathode, at one end injects an intense electron beam, such as from a Marx generator or a flux compression generator, optionally with a suitable pulse-forming network, e.g. a Blumlein transmission line. The pulse has a magnitude in the range of a hundred or more kilovolts and duration of about 50–150 nanoseconds. The electrons are attracted to a thin anode, such as an aluminized PET film or a stainless steel mesh, that is connected to the grounded waveguide body. The unit is surrounded by a magnet. Due to the intensity of the electron beam, many electrons pass through the anode into the region beyond it, forming a virtual cathode. The electron beam must be so intense as to exceed the space-charge-limiting current in that region, causing oscillations that generate microwaves. The frequency, efficiency and other characteristics of the emitted beam depend on the precise physical configuration and operating parameters.

A coaxial design exists where the cathode forms an outer ring surrounding the anode cylinder, with the virtual cathode forming along the cylinder's axis. Such design can be directly integrated with a waveguide.

The frequencies are usually in the region of 0.5–1.5, 2–6, 3, or 5–18 GHz. Other frequencies are also possible. Lower frequencies are usable for jamming communications, higher frequencies can be harnessed for their destructive effects on electronics. Power levels on the order of 10^{10} to 10^{12} watts are possible.

A design successor of a vircator is a reditron, which has higher efficiency and narrower bandwidth.

== Function ==
The massive short pulse of high voltage causes the cathode to emit an intense burst of electrons by the field electron emission mechanism. The electrons are attracted to the anode. A large proportion of the electrons passes through the anode and forms a cloud behind it, forming the virtual cathode. However, the electrons are still attracted by the anode (and repulsed by each other), so they change direction and fly back towards the anode, only to pass through again and be repulsed by the cathode and attracted towards the anode. The rapidly accelerating and decelerating electrons, as they oscillate back and forth between the real and virtual cathode through the mesh anode at microwave frequencies, then produce electromagnetic radiation.

== Sources ==
- U.S. patent 4,345,220, High power microwave generator using relativistic electron beam in waveguide drift tube, to Donald J. Sullivan, 1982
- U.S. patent 4,730,170, "Virtual cathode microwave generator having annular anode slit," Thomas J. T. Kwan, 1988
- Donald J. Sullivan, "High Power Microwave Generation From a Virtual Cathode Oscillator (Vircator)," IEEE Trans. Nucl. Sci., vol. NS-30, No. 4, 3426-3428 (Aug. 1983)
- Thomas J. T. Kwan, "High-Power Coherent Microwave Generation from Oscillating Virtual Cathodes," Phys. Fluids 27 (1), 228-232 (Jan. 1984)
- Libor DRAŽAN, Roman VRÁNA, "Axial Vircator for Electronic Warfare Applications"
