= Marx generator =

High-voltage pulse generator

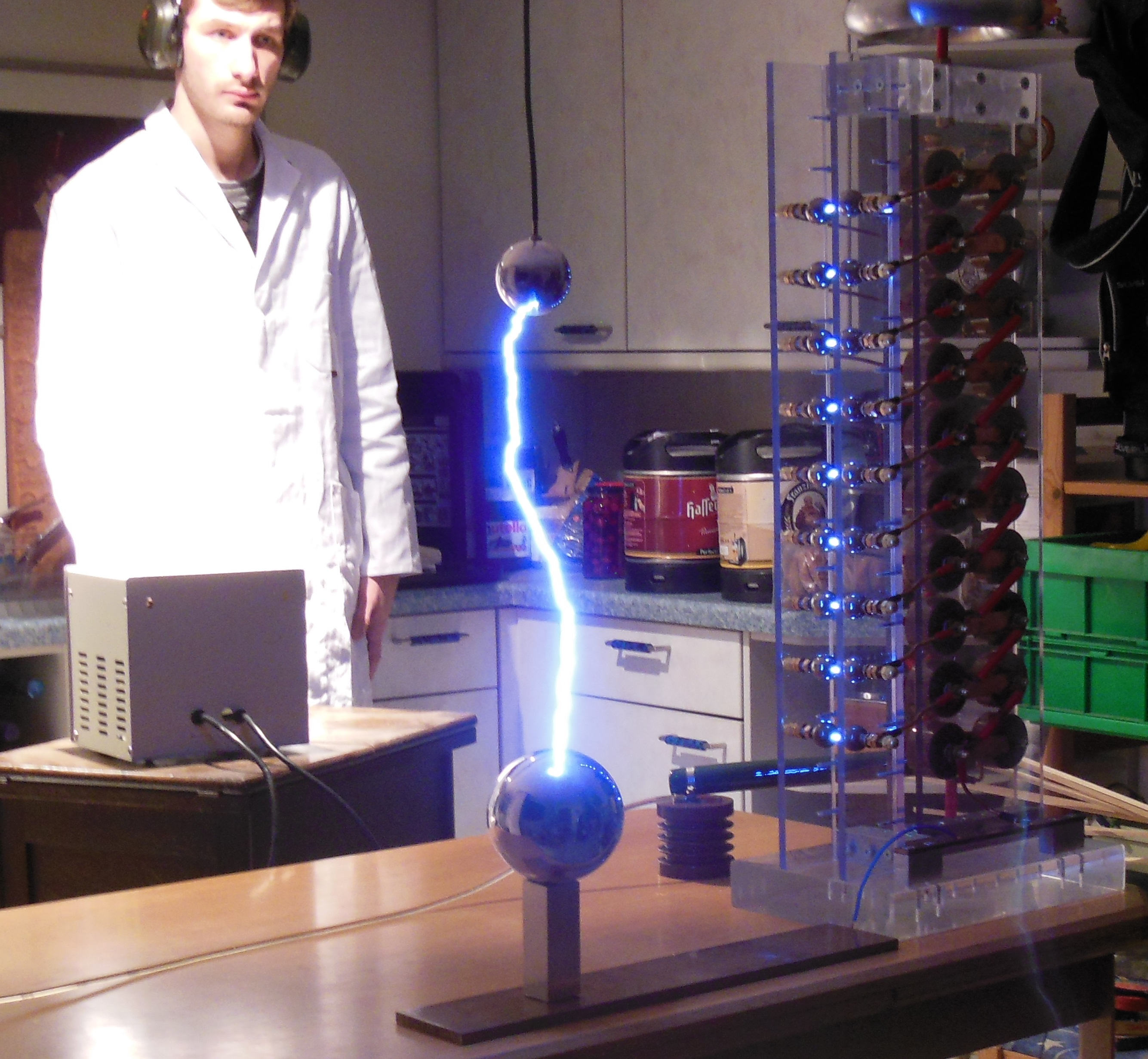
A small demonstration Marx generator (tower on the right). It is a ten stage generator. The main discharge is on the left. The nine smaller sparks that can be seen in the image are the spark gaps that connect the charged capacitors in series.

A Marx generator is an electrical circuit first described by Erwin Otto Marx in 1924. Its purpose is to generate a high-voltage pulse from a low-voltage DC supply. Marx generators are used in high-energy physics experiments, as well as to simulate the effects of lightning on power-line gear and aviation equipment. A bank of 36 Marx generators is used by Sandia National Laboratories to generate X-rays in their Z Machine.

== Principle of operation ==
Marx generator diagrams; Although the left capacitor has the greatest charge rate, the generator is typically allowed to charge for a long period of time, and all capacitors eventually reach the same charge voltage.

The circuit generates a high-voltage pulse by charging a number of capacitors in parallel, then suddenly connecting them in series. See the circuit diagram on the right. At first, n capacitors (C) are charged in parallel to a voltage V_{C} by a DC power supply through the resistors (R_{C}). The spark gaps used as switches have the voltage V_{C} across them, but the gaps have a breakdown voltage greater than V_{C}, so they all behave as open circuits while the capacitors charge. The last gap isolates the output of the generator from the load; without that gap, the load would prevent the capacitors from charging. To create the output pulse, the first spark gap is caused to break down (triggered); the breakdown effectively shorts the gap, placing the first two capacitors in series, applying a voltage of about 2V_{C} across the second spark gap. Consequently, the second gap breaks down to add the third capacitor to the "stack", and the process continues to sequentially break down all of the gaps. This process of the spark gaps connecting the capacitors in series to create the high voltage is called erection. The last gap connects the output of the series "stack" of capacitors to the load. Ideally, the output voltage will be nV_{C}, the number of capacitors times the charging voltage, but in practice the value is less. Note that none of the charging resistors R_{c} are subjected to more than the charging voltage even when the capacitors have been erected. The charge available is limited to the charge on the capacitors, so the output is a brief pulse as the capacitors discharge through the load. At some point, the spark gaps stop conducting, and the low-voltage supply begins charging the capacitors again.

The principle of multiplying voltage by charging capacitors in parallel and discharging them in series is also used in the voltage multiplier circuit, used to produce high voltages for laser printers and cathode-ray tube television sets, which has similarities to this circuit. One difference is that the voltage multiplier is powered with alternating current and produces a steady DC output voltage, whereas the Marx generator produces a pulse.

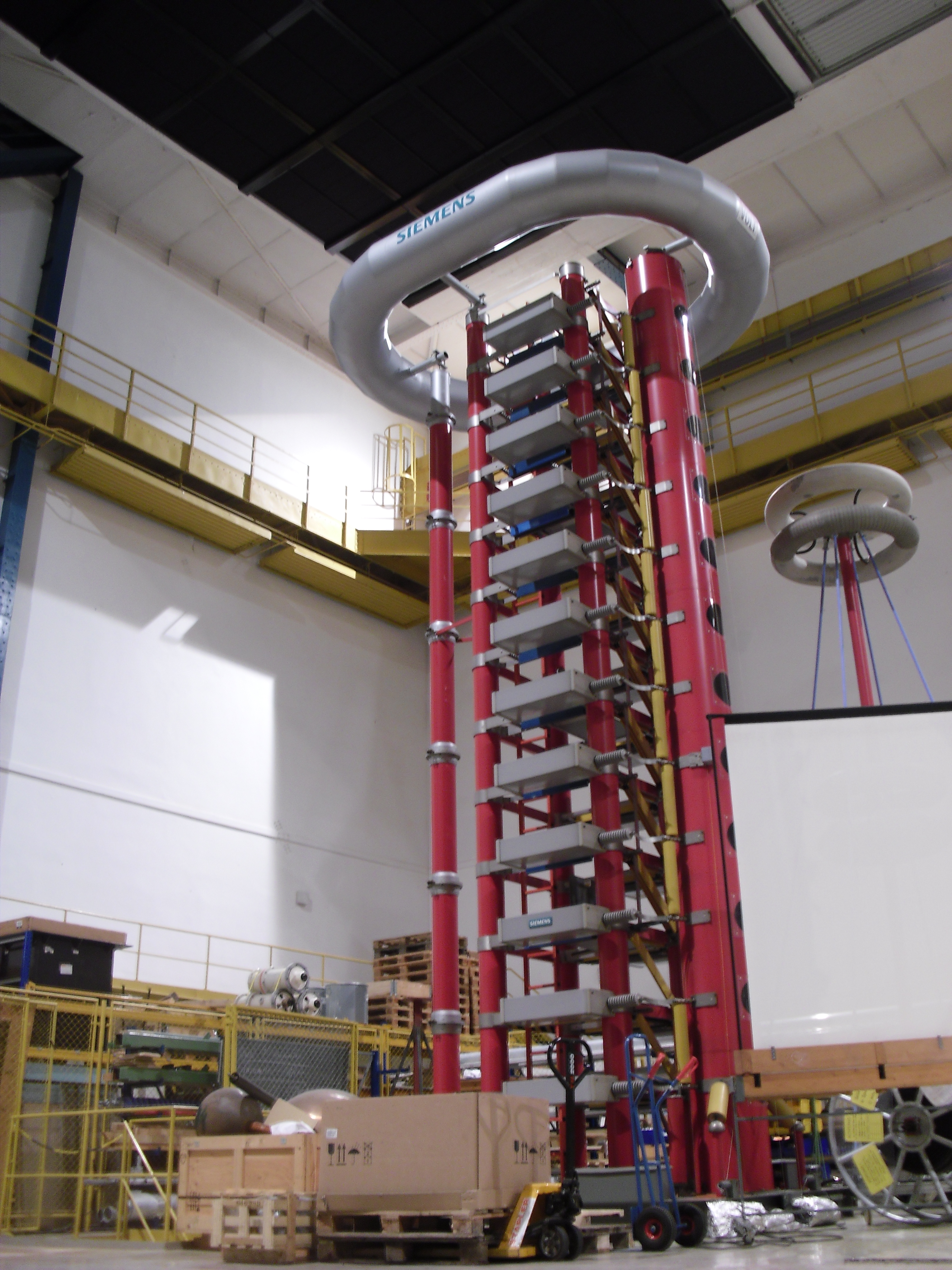
Marx generator used for testing high-voltage power-transmission components at TU Dresden, Germany

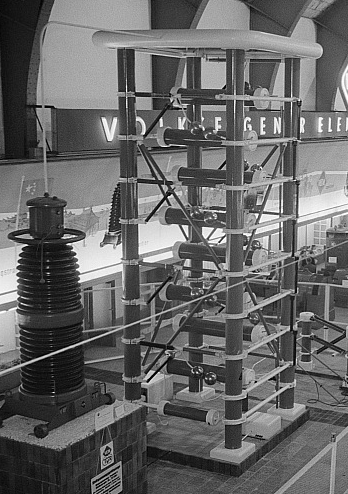
Marx generator at a utility trade fair, Leipzig, East Germany, 1954

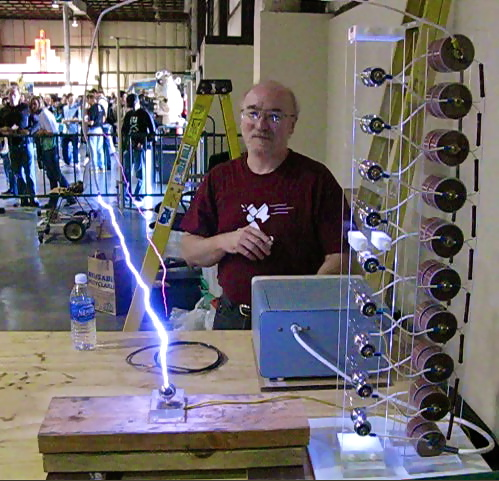
600 kV 10-stage Marx generator in operation

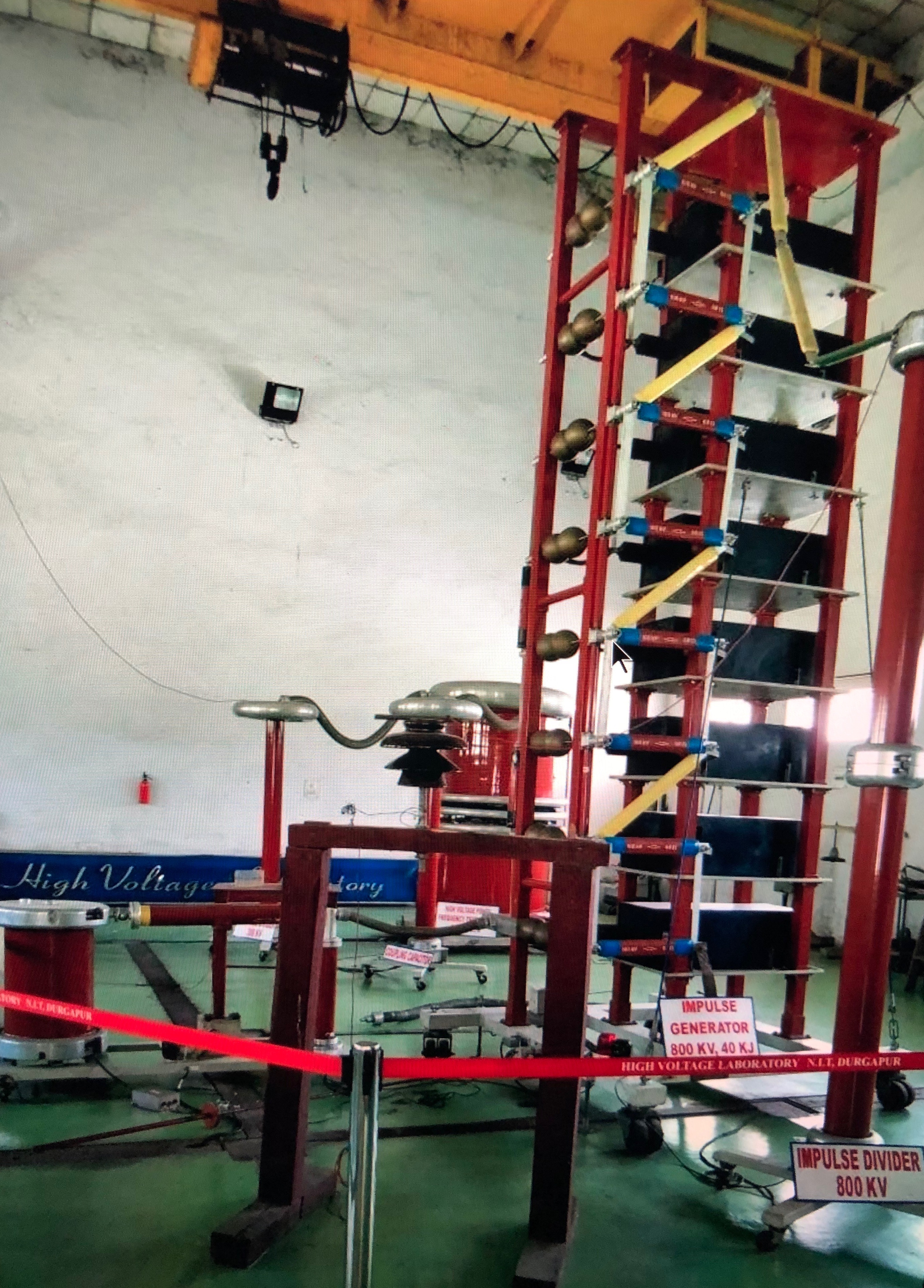
800 kV Marx generator in laboratory at the National Institute of Technology, Durgapur India.

== Optimization ==
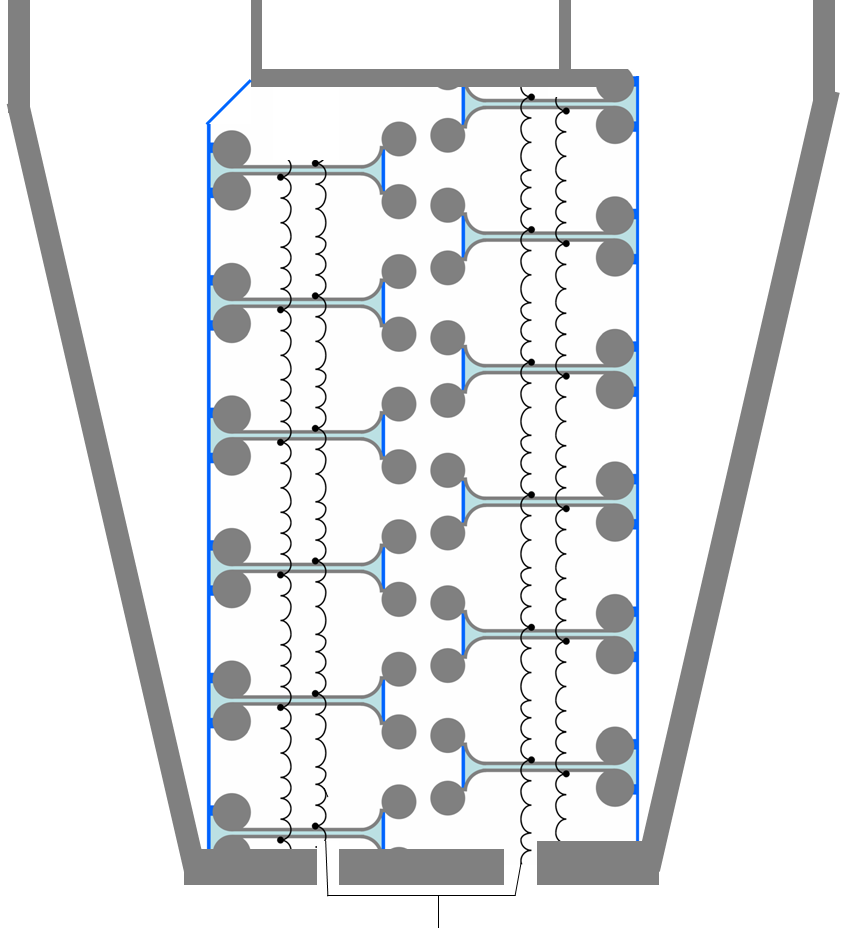
To deliver 5 ns rise time pulses, the Marx generator is often built into a coaxial wave guide. The spark gaps are placed as close as possible together for maximum UV light exchange for minimum jitter. DC HV comes from underneath, pulsed HV leaves at the top into the coaxial line. The double line of spheres in the middle are the spark gaps, all other spheres are to avoid corona discharge. Blue=water capacitor. Grey=solid metal. Black= thin wire. The outer conductor also functions as a vessel, so that the gas and the pressure can be optimized.

Proper performance depends upon capacitor selection and the timing of the discharge. Switching times can be improved by doping of the electrodes with radioactive isotopes caesium 137 or nickel 63, and by orienting the spark gaps so that ultraviolet light from a firing spark gap switch illuminates the remaining open spark gaps. Insulation of the high voltages produced is often accomplished by immersing the Marx generator in transformer oil or a high pressure dielectric gas such as sulfur hexafluoride (SF_{6}).

The time for a charging circuit to fully charge a discharged capacitor depends on the current from the power supply. The lower the resistance between a capacitor and the power supply, the faster it will charge. Thus, in this design, those closer to the power supply will charge sooner than those farther away. If the generator is allowed to charge long enough, all capacitors will attain the same voltage.

In the ideal case, the closing of the switch closest to the charging power supply applies a voltage 2V to the second switch. This switch will then close, applying a voltage 3V to the third switch. This switch will then close, resulting in a cascade down the generator that produces nV at the generator output (again, only in the ideal case).

The first switch may be allowed to spontaneously break down (sometimes called a self break) during charging if the absolute timing of the output pulse is unimportant. However, it is usually intentionally triggered once all the capacitors in the Marx bank have reached full charge, either by reducing the gap distance, by pulsing an additional trigger electrode (such as a Trigatron), by ionising the air in the gap using a pulsed laser, or by reducing the air pressure within the gap.

The charging resistors, R_{c}, need to be properly sized for both charging and discharging. They are sometimes replaced with inductors for improved efficiency and faster charging. In many generators the resistors are made from plastic or glass tubing filled with dilute copper sulfate solution. These liquid resistors overcome many of the problems experienced by more-conventional solid resistive materials, which have a tendency to lower their resistance over time under high voltage conditions.

== Short pulses ==
The Marx generator is also used to generate short high-power pulses for Pockels cells, driving a TEA laser, ignition of the conventional explosive of a nuclear weapon, and radar pulses.

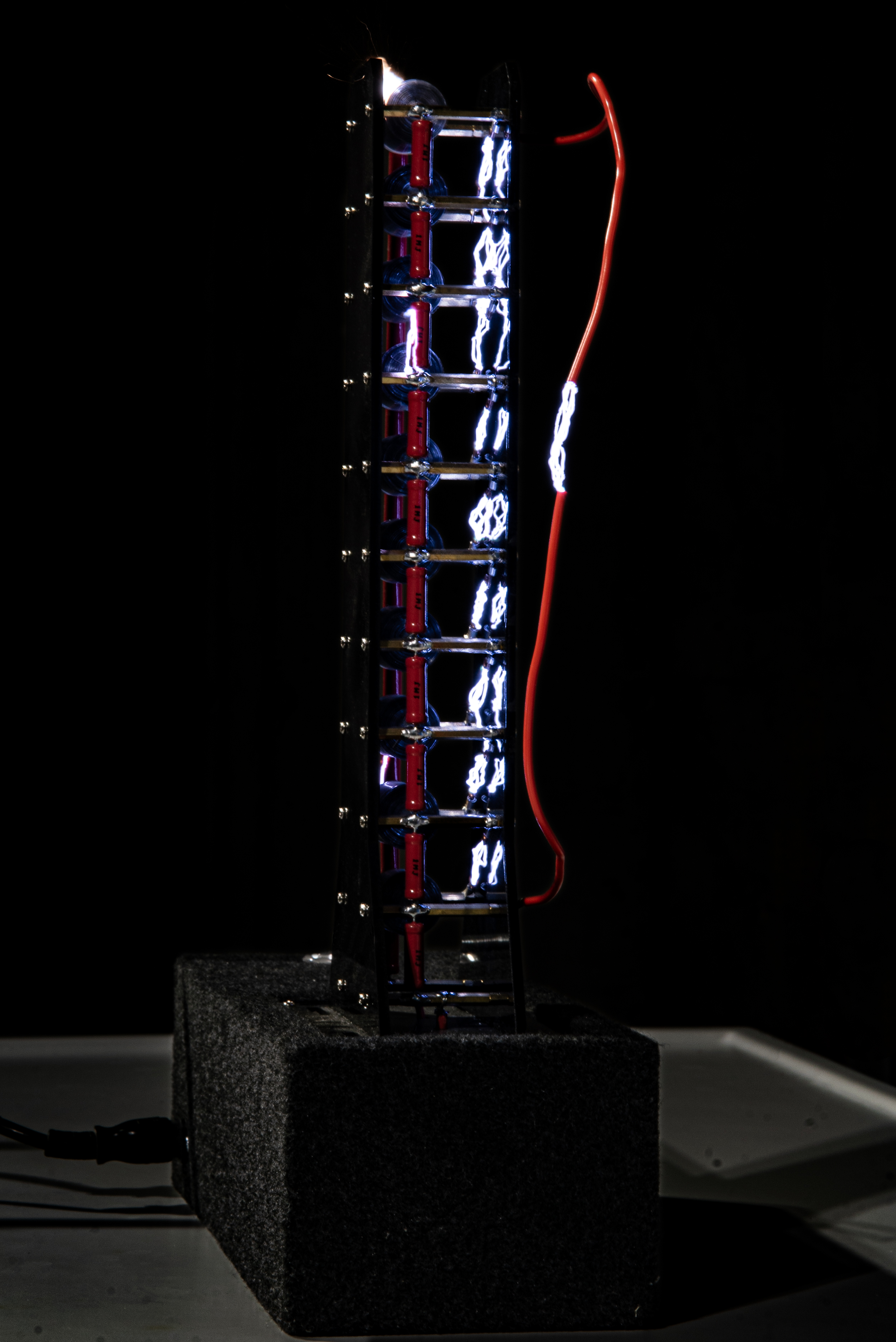
Marx generator. Air is a poor conductor of electricity, but with sufficient voltage (30 kV/cm), air transforms into a conductor, resulting in a spark discharge.

Shortness is relative, as the switching time of even high-speed versions is not less than 1 ns, and thus many low-power electronic devices are faster. In the design of high-speed circuits, electrodynamics is important, and the Marx generator supports this insofar as it uses short thick leads between its components, but the design is nevertheless essentially an electrostatic one. When the first gap breaks down, pure electrostatic theory predicts that the voltage across all stages rises. However, stages are coupled capacitively to ground and serially to each other, and thus each stage encounters a voltage rise that is increasingly weaker the further the stage is from the switching one; the adjacent stage to the switching one therefore encounters the largest voltage rise, and thus switches in turn. As more stages switch, the voltage rise to the remainder increases, which speeds up their operation. Thus a voltage rise fed into the first stage becomes amplified and steepened at the same time.

In electrodynamic terms, when the first stage breaks down it creates a spherical electromagnetic wave whose electric field vector is opposed to the static high voltage. This moving electromagnetic field has the wrong orientation to trigger the next stage, and may even reach the load; such noise in front of the edge is undesirable in many switching applications. If the generator is inside a tube of (say) 1 m diameter, it requires around 10 wave reflections for the field to settle to static conditions, which restricts pulse leading edge width to 30 ns or more. Smaller devices are faster.

The speed of a switch is determined by the speed of the charge carriers, which gets higher with higher voltage, and by the current available to charge the inevitable parasitic capacitance. In solid-state avalanche devices, a high voltage automatically leads to high current. Because the high voltage is applied only for a short time, solid-state switches will not heat up excessively. As compensation for the higher voltages encountered, the later stages have to carry lower charge too. Stage cooling and capacitor recharging also go well together.

== Stage variants ==
Avalanche diodes can replace a spark gap for stage voltages less than 500 volts. The charge carriers easily leave the electrodes, so no extra ionisation is needed and jitter is low. The diodes also have a longer lifetime than spark gaps.

A speedy switching device is an NPN avalanche transistor fitted with a coil between base and emitter. The transistor is initially switched off and about 300 volts exists across its collector-base junction. This voltage is high enough that a charge carrier in this region can create more carriers by impact ionisation, but the probability is too low to form a proper avalanche; instead a somewhat noisy leakage current flows. When the preceding stage switches, the emitter-base junction is pushed into forward bias and the collector-base junction enters full avalanche mode, so charge carriers injected into the collector-base region multiply in a chain reaction. Once the Marx generator has completely fired, voltages everywhere drop, each switch avalanche stops, its matched coil puts its base-emitter junction into reverse bias, and the low static field allows remaining charge carriers to drain out of its collector-base junction.

== Applications ==
One application is so-called boxcar switching of a Pockels cell. Four Marx generators are used, each of the two electrodes of the Pockels cell being connected to a positive pulse generator and a negative pulse generator. Two generators of opposite polarity, one on each electrode, are first fired to charge the Pockels cell into one polarity. This will also partly charge the other two generators but not trigger them, because they have been only partly charged beforehand. Leakage through the Marx resistors needs to be compensated by a small bias current through the generator. At the trailing edge of the boxcar, the two other generators are fired to "reverse" the cell.

Marx generators are used to provide high-voltage pulses for the testing of insulation of electrical apparatus such as large power transformers, or insulators used for supporting power transmission lines. Voltages applied may exceed two million volts for high-voltage apparatus.

In the food industry, Marx generators are used for pulsed electric field processing to induce cutting improvement or drying acceleration for potato and other fruits and vegetables.

== See also ==
- ATLAS-I
- Cockcroft–Walton generator – a similar circuit with the same "ladder" structure; CW generator produce rectified DC from an AC input
- Explosively pumped flux compression generator – a solution to the dual problem of creating high current pulses
- Ignition coil
- Induction coil
- Istra High Voltage Research Center
- Linear transformer driver – a modern high-current high-voltage pulse generator with tailorable rise time and width
- Tesla coil
- Vector inversion generator – a transmission-line device using a similar charge in parallel discharge in series approach
