= List of nuclear fusion companies =

Commercial fusion is a term used to refer to privately or publicly held companies which aim to sell products (e.g., isotopes) or services (e.g., electricity) produced by nuclear fusion. Reactor-scale nuclear fusion has exceeded scientific break-even, opening the way for commercial reactor development. Forecasts and studies of fusion reactor-generated electricity costs range from high, to very low, down to one cent per kilowatt-hour, rivaling some low-cost forecasts for solar power photovoltaic systems.

== Maintained lists ==
Several organizations of varied types track and document the growing fusion industry and regularly publish maintained, curated, updated international lists of companies which are working to develop and sell fusion reactors and related equipment and other technology.

Organization (location)	Market focus	Company count	Latest update	Update frequency
Dealroom.co (Amsterdam, Netherlands)	Europe, fusion-related startups	38	2026-11-01	Intermittent, as needed
Energy Startups (United States)	World	48	2026-10-30	Intermittent, as needed
Fusion Energy Base (New York City, New York)	World	73	2026 (no other date)	Intermittent, as needed
Fusion Industry Association (Washington, D.C.)	World	55 (archive)	2026-07	Yearly
FusionX Group (Oxfordshire, England)	World	91	2026 (no other date)	Intermittent, as needed
Nature (London, England)	World	46	2026-08-26	Intermittent, as needed
TechCrunch (San Francisco, California)	World, $100+ million private equity investment	17	2026-08-15	Intermittent, as needed
Wikipedia (San Francisco, California)	World	87 (below)	2026-11-09	Intermittent, as needed

As of 2026, the Fusion Industry Association reports that combined cumulative, aggregate, historic total investment in fusion technology has exceeded $14.2 billion.

== Commercial fusion companies ==
Companies pursue various different fusion methods and geometries for reactors. Some pursue one method, such as magnetic, inertial, or electrostatic confinement. Some pursue hybrid methods such as magneto–inertial or magneto–electrostatic confinement. More methods exist, many of which are listed in the table below. These varied methods can influence strongly many reactor and balance of plant considerations and systems.

Company	Years active	Method	Fuel(s)	Country	Funding	References, notes
Acceleron Fusion (formerly NK Labs, LLC)	2008–2022 (NK Labs); 2023–present (Acceleron)	Muon-catalyzed	Deuterium–tritium	United States		
Alpha Ring	2015–present	Electron-catalyzed	Proton–boron-11	United States	$4.67M	
American Fusion (merger: Renewal Fuels, Kepler Fusion)	2007–2025 (Renewal); 1947–present (Kepler)	Magnetic confinement: stellarator: torsatron: pulsed	Deuterium–helium-3	United States		Kepler is a subsidiary of American
Anubal Fusion	2024–present	Inertial confinement: laser	Proton–boron-11	India	$500K	
ASPL Fusion (Agnira Sanlayan Pvt. Ltd.)	2025–present	Solid target: particle accelerator beam driven; Magnetic confinement: tandem mirror	Proton–lithium; Deuterium–deuterium	India	$2M	
Astral Systems	2021–present	Inertial-electrostatic: Lattice confinement	Deuterium–tritium, deuterium–deuterium	United Kingdom	$40M	Focus: producing radioisotopes, not energy
Avalanche Energy	2018–present	Magneto–electrostatic confinement: cusp, colliding beam	Deuterium–tritium	United States	$105M	
Blue Laser Fusion	2022–present	Inertial confinement: optical enhancement cavity (OEC) laser	Proton–boron-11	United States	$62.5M	
Borealis Fusion	2026–present	Magnetic confinement: tandem mirror	Proton–boron	United States	$6M	University spin-off: Princeton University
Cambridge Heavy Industries	2025–present	Inertial confinement: laser	Deuterium–deuterium	United States	$6.2M	University spin-off: Massachusetts Institute of Technology
China Fusion Energy Company (CFEC)	2025–present	Magnetic confinement: tokamak	Deuterium–tritium	China	$2.1B	CFEC is a subsidiary of China National Nuclear Corporation (CNNC)
Ciral Fusion	2024–present	Inertial confinement: impact collider	Deuterium–tritium	Australia		
Commonwealth Fusion Systems	2018–present	Magnetic confinement: tokamak	Deuterium–tritium	United States	$4B	University spin-off: Massachusetts Institute of Technology
Cortex Fusion Systems	2021–present	Inertial confinement: non-thermal, laser	Deuterium–tritium	United States	$1.8M	
Crossfield Fusion Ltd	2019–present	Closed orbit, velocity resonant systems		United Kingdom		Reactor development ended 2021
CTFusion, Inc	2015–2023	Magnetic confinement: dynomak	Deuterium–tritium	United States		University spin-off: University of Washington
Dante Fusion	2025–present	Magnetic confinement: tokamak: spherical	Deuterium–tritium	Denmark		University spin-off: Technical University of Denmark
Deutelio	2022–present	Magnetic confinement: levitated dipole	Deuterium–deuterium	Switzerland	$540K	
Dongsheng Fusion (SunUp Fusion Technology)	2025–present	Magnetic confinement: tokamak	Deuterium–helium-3	China	$100M	University spin-off: Fudan University
Electric Fusion Systems	2020–present	Non-thermal: light element electric fusion (LEEF) via Rydberg matter	Proton–lithium-7	United States		
EMC2 (Energy Matter Conversion Corporation)	1985–present	Magneto-electrostatic confinement: polywell	Deuterium–tritium	United States		
Energy Singularity Energy Technology	2021–present	Magnetic confinement: tokamak	Deuterium–tritium	China		
ENN Energy	2017–present	Magnetic confinement: spheromak	Proton–boron-11	China	$590M	
Eterna Fusion	2026–present	Magnetic confinement: tokamak: spherical	Deuterium–tritium	South Korea	$1.7M	University spin-off: Seoul National University
EX-Fusion	2021–present	Inertial confinement: laser	Deuterium–tritium	Japan	$38M	
Firefly Fusion	2023–present	Magnetic confinement: tokamak	Deuterium–tritium	France; Switzerland	$90K	DIII-D tokamak research partner
First Light Fusion	2011–present	Inertial confinement: impact	Deuterium–tritium	United Kingdom	$156M	University spin-off: University of Oxford
Focused Energy	2021–present	Inertial confinement: laser	Deuterium–tritium	Germany	$500M	
Fuse Energy Technologies Corporation	2019–present	Magneto-inertial: magnetized liner	Deuterium–tritium	United States	$20M	
Fusion Power Corporation	2016–2019	Inertial confinement: heavy ion	Deuterium–tritium	United States		
Gauss Fusion	2022–present	Magnetic confinement: stellarator	Deuterium–tritium	Germany		
General Atomics Fusion Division	2022–present	Magnetic confinement: tokamak	Deuterium–tritium	United States		
General Fusion	2002–present	Magneto-inertial: magnetized target	Deuterium–tritium	Canada	$612M	
GenF	2024–present	Inertial confinement: laser	Deuterium–tritium	France	$10.8M	
HB11 Energy	2017–present	Inertial confinement: non-thermal, laser	Proton–boron-11	Australia		
Helical Fusion	2021–present	Magnetic confinement: stellarator	Deuterium–tritium	Japan		
Helicity Space	2018–present	Magneto-inertial: plasma jet collider-compressor	Deuterium–deuterium	United States		For spaceflight
Helion Energy	2013–present	Magneto-inertial: field-reversed configuration collider-compressor	Deuterium–deuterium	United States	$3.2B	
HHMAX-Energy Technology (Hanhai Fusion)	2022–present	Magnetic confinement: field-reversed configuration collider-compressor	Deuterium–tritium	China	$2.75M	
Horne Technologies	2008– present	Magneto–electrostatic confinement: cusp	Deuterium– deuterium, proton– boron-11	United States		
Hylenr	2018– present	Lattice confinement: particle accelerator beam driven	Hydrogen	India		
HyperJet Fusion	2017– 2022	Magneto-inertial: plasmoid imploded by plasma jets		United States		
Inertia Enterprises	2025– present	Inertial confinement: laser	Deuterium– tritium	United States	$500M	Research spin-off: Lawrence Livermore National Laboratory National Ignition Facility
Infroton Fusion	2024–present	Magneto-inertial: lasers, cavity pressure acceleration	Deuterium–deuterium	United States		
Innoven Energy	2010–present	Inertial confinement: laser	Deuterium–tritium	United States	$18.1M	
Jupiter Volta	2022–present	Magnetic confinement: z-pinch: stabilized	Deuterium–helium-3	United States	$3.65M	
KMS Fusion	1969–1990	Inertial confinement: laser	Deuterium– tritium	United States		Work moved to General Atomics
Kronos Fusion Energy	2022–present	Magnetic confinement: tokamak: spherical	Deuterium–tritium	United States		
Kyoto Fusioneering	2019– present	Magnetic confinement: reactor subsystems	Deuterium– tritium	Japan	$191M	University spin-off: Kyoto University
LaserFusionX	2022– present	Inertial confinement: krypton-fluoride laser	Deuterium– tritium	United States	$458K	Research spin-off: United States Naval Research Laboratory
Liberty Fusion	2025–present	Magneto-inertial: plasma jet-driven plasma liner	Deuterium–tritium	United States	$0.625M	Research spin-off: Los Alamos National Laboratory
Linea Innovations	2023–present	Magnetic confinement: field-reversed configuration: beam driven: in tandem mirror	Proton–boron-11	Japan	$11.8M	University spin-off: Nihon University, University of Tsukuba
Lockheed Martin	2010– present	Magnetic confinement: cusp	Deuterium– tritium	United States		
Longview Fusion Energy Systems	2021– present	Inertial confinement: laser	Deuterium– tritium	United States		
LPP Fusion, Inc. (Lawrenceville Plasma Physics)	2003– present	Magnetic confinement pinch: dense plasma focus	Proton– boron-11	United States		President, chief scientist: Eric J. Lerner
Magneto Inertial Fusion Technology Inc. (MIFTI)	2008– present	Magneto-inertial: z-pinch	Deuterium– tritium	United States		University spin-off: University of California, Irvine; Division: US Nuclear Corp
Marvel Fusion	2019– present	Inertial confinement: laser	Proton– boron-11	Germany	$440M	
Norrønt AS (formerly Ultrafusion Nuclear Power)	2016–2017 (Ultrafusion); 2018– present (Norrønt)	Muon-catalyzed	Deuterium– tritium	Norway		Merged with Norrønt Fusion Energy
nT-Tao	2019– present	Magnetic confinement: stellarator	Deuterium– tritium	Israel	$34M minimum	
NearStar Fusion	2021– present	Magneto-inertial: magnetized target, impact	Deuterium– tritium, Deuterium– deuterium, proton– boron-11	United States	$2M	Corporate spin-off: HyperJet Fusion
NovaFusion Energy Technology (NovaFusionX)	2025– present	Magnetic confinement: field-reversed configuration collider-compressor	Deuterium– tritium	China	$171.9M	
Novatron Fusion Group AB	2019– present	Magnetic confinement: mirror	Deuterium– tritium	Sweden	$28M	
OpenStar Technologies	2021– present	Magnetic confinement: levitated dipole	Deuterium– deuterium (tritium suppressed)	New Zealand	$29.4M	
Pacific Fusion	2023– present	Inertial confinement: magnetized liner inertial fusion (MagLIF)	Deuterium– tritium	United States	$1B	Founding chief executive officer is Eric Lander
Pranos Fusion Energy	2024– present	Magnetic confinement: tokamak	Deuterium– tritium	India	$7.2M	Research spin-off: Institute for Plasma Research
Princeton Fusion Systems (formerly Princeton Satellite Systems)	1992–2017 (Satellite); 2018– present (Fusion)	Magnetic confinement: field-reversed configuration	Deuterium– deuterium	United States		
Proxima Fusion	2023– present	Magnetic confinement: quasi-isodynamic stellarator	Deuterium– tritium	Germany	$740M (€641M)	Research spin-off: Max Planck Institute for Plasma Physics
Pulsar Fusion	2011–present	Magnetic confinement: field-reversed configuration	Deuterium–helium-3	United Kingdom	$5.81M	For spaceflight
Realta Fusion	2022– present	Magnetic confinement: tandem mirror	Deuterium– tritium	United States	$57.5M	University spin-off: University of Wisconsin–Madison
Renaissance Fusion	2021– present	Magnetic confinement: stellarator	Deuterium– tritium	France		
Rosatom	2007–present	Magnetic confinement: tokamak	Deuterium–tritium	Russia	$701M	
Shine Technologies	2005–2017 (Phoenix); 2010– present (Shine)	Magneto-electrostatic confinement: particle accelerator	Deuterium– tritium	United States	Over $1B	Corporate spin-off: Phoenix Nuclear Labs, 2010; Focus: producing radioisotopes, not energy
Smart Fusion Energy	2026–present	Magnetic confinement: tokamak: spherical	Deuterium–tritium	Spain		University spin-off: University of Seville
Snap Fusion	2026–present	Semiconductor-scale	Unpublished	Germany		
Startorus Fusion	2021– present	Magnetic confinement: tokamak: spherical	Deuterium– tritium	China	$138.9M	Research spin-off: Tsinghua University
Stellarex, Inc	2022– present	Magnetic confinement: stellarator	Deuterium– tritium	United States		University spin-off: Princeton University
TAE Technologies (formerly Tri Alpha Energy)	1998–2017 (Tri Alpha); 2017– present (TAE)	Magnetic confinement: field-reversed configuration: beam driven	Proton– boron-11	United States	$1.6B	University spin-off: University of California, Irvine
Terra Fusion Energy	2024– present	Magnetic confinement: tandem mirror: centrifugal	Deuterium– tritium	United States		University spin-off: University of Maryland, Baltimore
Thea Energy (formerly Princeton Stellarators)	2022– present	Magnetic confinement: stellarator	Deuterium– tritium	United States	$130M	
Tibbar Plasma Technologies	2015– present	Magneto-electrostatic confinement: oscillating plasma vortex ring collider	Proton– boron-11	United States	$4.8M	
Tokamak Energy	2009– present	Magnetic confinement: tokamak	Deuterium– tritium	United Kingdom	$336M	Research spin-off: Culham Centre for Fusion Energy
Type One Energy Group	2019– present	Magnetic confinement: stellarator	Deuterium– tritium	United States	$469M	
Xcimer Energy Inc.	2022– present	Inertial confinement: excimer laser	Deuterium– tritium	United States	$100M	
Xeonova (Hefei Xeonova Technology, or Hefei Xingneng Xuanguang Technology)	2024–present	Magnetic confinement: field-reversed configuration	Deuterium–tritium	China	$100M	University spin-off: University of Science and Technology of China
Yan Fusion	2025–present	Magnetic confinement: stellarator	Deuterium–tritium	China	$293M	
Zap Energy	2017– present	Magnetic confinement: z-pinch	Deuterium– tritium	United States	$327M	University spin-off: University of Washington
Zephyr Fusion	2025–present	Magnetic confinement: levitated dipole	Deuterium–deuterium	United States	$0.125M	Outer space-based reactors

== See also ==
- Milestone-Based Fusion Development Program
