= List of fusion power technologies =

The following is a list of fusion power technologies that have been practically attempted:

== Pioneers ==
- Beam-target (Oliphant, 1934)
- Convergent shock-waves (Huemul, Argentina)
- Magneto-electrostatic toroid trap (ATOLL, Artsimovich)
- Tokamak (T-1 to 10, Kurchatov Institute, JET, ITER is under construction, and many more)
- Toroidal z-pinch (ZETA)

== Magnetic ==
- Accelerated FRC (TCS-U)
- Bumpy torus (ELMO, EBT, ORNL)
- Galatea (Tornado)

- Magnetic suspension (Levitron)

- High beta tokamak (HBT-EP)
- Levitated dipole
- Odd-parity RMF
- Reversed field pinch (MST, RFX-Mod Italy)
- Tokamak (Spherical tokamak (MAST, NSTX), Spheromak (Dynomak, SSPX Lawrence Livermore))
- Stellarator (Wendelstein 7-X)

- Non-neutral plasma (Columbia Non-neutral Torus)
- Compact (NCSX Princeton [cancelled])

- Tandem mirror (Gamma-10 Japan)

== Inertial ==
- Laser Inertial (NIF) - direct drive
- Inertial confinement fusion - indirect drive
- Inertial confinement fusion - Fast Ignition
- Heavy ion fusion (HIF, HIFAR Lawrence Berkeley)
- Magnetized liner inertial fusion (MagLIF): Combination pinch and laser ICF

== Z-pinch ==
- Z-pinch
  - Pulsed z-pinch (Saturn, Sandia)
  - High density Z-pinch (MAGPIE Imperial College)
  - Inverse Z-pinch
  - Shear flow stabilized (Zap Energy)

== Inertial electrostatic confinement ==
- Fusor (Fusor, Farnsworth)
- IEC (Fusor, Hirsch-Meeks)
- IEC with Periodically Oscillating Plasma Sphere (POPS, LANL)
- IEC with plasma electrode (PoF, Sanns)
- IEC with beam/spherical capacitor (STAR, Sesselmann)
- Polywell (Fusor and magnetic mirror hybrid)
- IEC with Penning trap (Penning Fusion Experiment - PFX, LANL)
- F1 (electrostatic and magnetic cusp hybrid - Fusion One)

== Other, hybrids ==
- CT Accel (CTIX, UC Davis)
- Magneto-kinetic (PHDX, Plasma Dynamic Lab)
- Magnetized target (AFRL, LANL)
- Magneto-inertial (OMEGA laser, LLE, Rochester)
- Levitated dipole [superconducting] (LDX, MIT, PSGC)
- Maryland Centrifugal (MCX)
- Sheared magnetofluid/Bernoulli confinement (MBX, Uni Texas)
- Penning fusion (PFX, LANL)
- Plasma jets (HyperV, Chantilly)
- Magnetized target fusion with mechanical compression (General Fusion, Burnaby)
- Field-reversed colliding beams (Tri-Alpha)
- Muon-catalyzed fusion (Berkeley, Alvarez)
- Dense Plasma Focus (Focus fusion, Lawrenceville Plasma Physics, Lerner)
- Rotating lithium wall (RWE, Maryland)
