= Tokamak Energy =

British fusion power research company

Tokamak Energy, Ltd.
- Type: Private
- Industry: Fusion power
- Founded: 2009; 17 years ago
- Headquarters: Oxford, United Kingdom
- Key people: Warrick Matthews (MD); Dr Chris Martin (Chairman); Alan Skyes (founder) David Kingham (founder) Mikhail Gryaznevich (founder)
- Number of employees: 280 (2025)
- Subsidiaries: Tokamak Energy Inc.
- Website: www.tokamakenergy.co.uk

Tokamak Energy is a fusion power and superconducting technologies company based near Oxford in the United Kingdom, established in 2009. The company develops fusion energy systems and high temperature superconducting (HTS) technologies. While initially focused on the development of fusion energy, it has expanded into the development of HTS technologies for applications including power distribution, life sciences, propulsion and advanced manufacturing. In 2026, Tokamak Energy was named as Magnet Systems Partner for the UK Government's STEP Fusion programme.

As of 2025, the company had raised $335m, comprising $60m from the UK and US governments and $275m from private investors, including LRG Capital Group, Dr. Hans-Peter Wild, and David Harding, CEO of Winton Capital.

== History ==
Tokamak Energy was founded in 2009 by Alan Skyes, David Kingham and Mikhail Gryaznevich. Sykes had worked at the Culham Centre for Fusion Energy until 2008, where he pioneered the spherical tokamak approach, leading the record-breaking START tokamak. Gryaznevich was also a former Culham spherical tokamak pioneer.

One of the company's first devices was the copper magnet-based ST-25; in 2015 this was upgraded with rare-earth barium copper oxide (REBCO) high temperature superconductors (HTS) to the ST-25HTS.

From 2018 the company has operated the ST40 high-field compact spherical tokamak, which in March 2022 reached plasma ion temperature above 100 million degrees Celsius, considered the threshold for commercial fusion. A peer-reviewed scientific paper on the achievement has been published by the IAEA journal Nuclear Fusion.

In 2019, the company announced it achieved a 24 Tesla magnetic field at 20 Kelvin with its patented HTS magnet technology. In 2023, it announced it had built a set of HTS magnets to be assembled and tested in fusion power plant-relevant scenarios in its new Demo4 in-house facility. In 2025 the company successfully replicated fusion power plant fields for the first time with Demo4, achieving field strengths of 11.8 Tesla at -243 degrees Celsius in tests conducted at its headquarters outside Oxford, UK.

In October 2022, the UKAEA and Tokamak Energy announced a five-year framework agreement to collaborate on developing spherical tokamaks for power generation. The collaboration focuses on areas including materials development and testing, power generation, fuel cycle, diagnostics, and remote handling, in the UKAEA's STEP machine.

In May 2023, the United States Department of Energy granted the company's US subsidiary, Tokamak Energy Inc., additional funding through its Milestone-Based Fusion Development Program, which partners selected companies with U.S. national laboratories, universities, and other institutions to advance designs and R&D for fusion power plants, representing a major step in the U.S.'s commitment to a pilot-scale demonstration of fusion within a decade.

In November 2024, the company secured $125mn in a funding round led by East X Ventures and Lingotto Investment Management, which saw investment from British Patient Capital, Furukawa Electric Company, global maritime company BW Group and US-based Sabanci Climate Ventures.

In December 2024, the company announced that it had partnered with the United States Department of Energy and UK Department for Energy Security and Net Zero to accelerate fusion energy development through a $52M Upgrade to the ST40 facility.

In September 2025, Tokamak Energy acquired specialist engineering company Ridgway Machines in Leicestershire to accelerate the growth and manufacturing capabilities of its TE Magnetics HTS business. Ridgway Machines operates as a Tokamak Energy subsidiary, keeping its brand, staff, and facility unchanged.

In April 2026, Tokamak Energy was named as Magnet Systems Partner for the UK Government's STEP Fusion programme.

== See also ==
- Commonwealth Fusion Systems
- DEMOnstration Power Station
- Fusion Industry Association
- List of nuclear fusion companies
- Spherical Tokamak for Energy Production
