= Commonwealth Fusion Systems =

American nuclear fusion and energy company

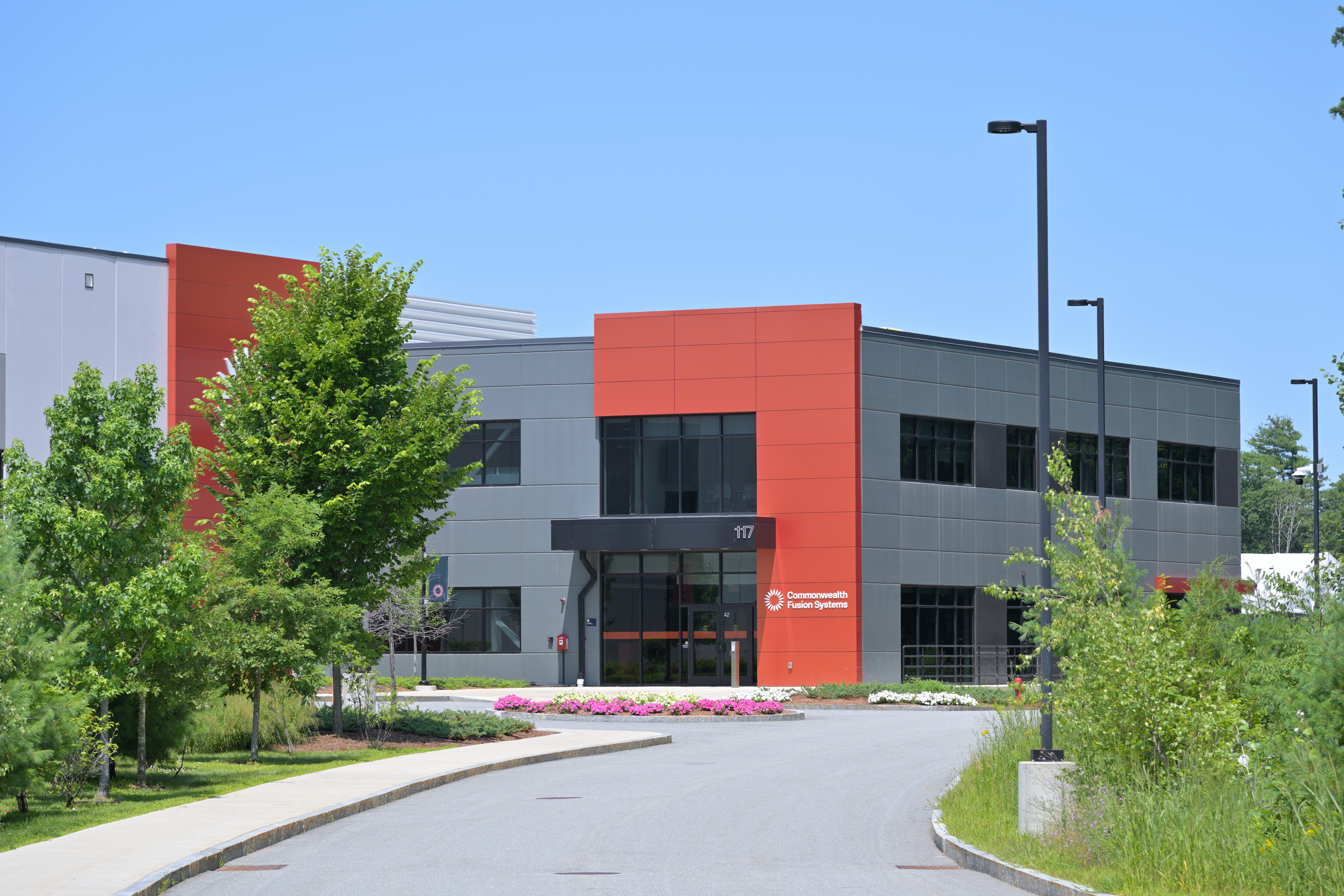
- Headquarters in Devens, Massachusetts in 2026
- Type: Private
- Industry: Fusion power
- Founded: 2018; 8 years ago
- Headquarters: Devens, Massachusetts, United States
- Key people: Bob Mumgaard (CEO)
- Number of employees: 1,000+ (2025)
- Website: cfs.energy

Commonwealth Fusion Systems (CFS) is an American fusion power company founded in 2018 in Cambridge, Massachusetts, after a spin-off from the Massachusetts Institute of Technology (MIT). Its high field tokamak approach is as an evolution of concepts initiated by Bruno Coppi and Ron Parker at MIT, particularly MIT's high field Alcator program.

Its stated goal is to build a small fusion power plant based on the ARC tokamak design. It has participated in the United States Department of Energy’s INFUSE public-private knowledge innovation scheme with several national labs and universities.

== History ==
CFS was founded in 2018 as a spin-off from the MIT Plasma Science and Fusion Center. After initial funding of $50 million in 2018 from the Italian multinational Eni, CFS closed its series A round of venture capital funding in 2019 with a total of US$115 million in funding from Eni, Bill Gates's Breakthrough Energy Ventures, Vinod Khosla's Khosla Ventures, and others. CFS raised an additional US$ 84million in series A2 funding from Singapore's Temasek, Norway's Equinor, and Devonshire Investors, as well as from previous investors.

In September 2020, the company reported significant progress in the physics and engineering design of the SPARC tokamak, and in October 2020, the development of a new high temperature superconducting cable, called VIPER. Over the 9-month period from 2019 to 2020, the company purchased over 186 miles of the wire in 400–600 meter lengths from vendors, more than was produced by some vendors over the preceding 6 years.

In March 2021, CFS announced plans to build a headquarters, manufacturing, and research campus (including the SPARC tokamak) in Devens, Massachusetts. In the same year, CEO Bob Mumgaard was appointed to the board of directors of the Fusion Industry Association, which was incorporated as a non profit association with a focus on combating climate change. Later in September 2021, the company announced the demonstration of a high temperature superconducting magnet, able to generate magnetic fields of 20 tesla.

The company raised an additional $1.8 billion in Series B funding in November 2021, to construct and operate the SPARC tokamak. This was funded by Temasek Holdings, Google, Bill Gates and Eni. In December of that year, the company began construction on SPARC in Devens, Massachusetts.

By late 2022, CFS had grown to approximately 350 employees and was preparing to move into its Devens campus. A ceremonial opening for the Devens campus was held in February 2023.

In March 2023, Eni and CFS signed a multi-year agreement to collaborate in obtaining the components and authorizations necessary for the construction of the first SPARC experimental plant, as well as the construction of the first Arc power plant and the identification of countries that may be interested in hosting it. In May of that year, the United States Department of Energy granted the company additional funding along with seven other US companies via the Milestone-Based Fusion Development Program. The following year, in 2024, CFS announced plans to build the world's first grid-scale commercial nuclear fusion power plant at the James River Industrial Center in Chesterfield County, Virginia. The plant will produce about 400 MWe. The company plans to build it by the early 2030s.

Google announced in July 2025 that it had signed a direct corporate power purchase agreement, a first of its kind, with CFS. The agreement will give Google 200 megawatts of power from CFS’s ARC project in Virginia. Later in August, CFS announced $863 million had been raised in a Series B2 round. In September 2025, Eni made a $1 billion deal with CFS to use power from its first fusion reactor.

In February 2026, Commonwealth Fusion was awarded a $2.5 million grant from the Commonwealth of Massachusetts to build battery storage and its SPARC reactor.

In July 2026, the company announced that it had secured one billion dollars in funding for its plant in Chesterfield. The plant is to be called the Fall Line Fusion Power Station.

In October 2026, the company received $86 million from the United States Department of Commerce to develop advanced electronics that can play a role in future fusion power development.

== Technology ==
CFS intends to demonstrate net-positive energy in a tokamak via the SPARC tokamak, which will pave the way for a multi-hundred MW electric ARC plant. They plan to achieve this by incorporating a large-bore, high field (20 tesla) superconducting magnet made of VIPER, a yttrium barium copper oxide superconducting tape. As a high-temperature superconductor, VIPER can sustain higher electric currents and magnetic fields than were previously possible. Previous tokamaks used copper or low-temperature superconducting magnets that need to be large in size to create the magnetic field that is necessary to achieve net energy. The CFS high-temperature superconductor magnet is intended to create much stronger magnetic fields, allowing the tokamaks to be much smaller.

The first magnet of this type was built and tested in 2021. The D-shaped magnet consisted of 16 layers, each containing HTS tape. It weighed 10 tons and stood 8 feet tall, including 165 miles of tape. SPARC will include 18 similar magnets. The magnet technology used in SPARC is intended to give "the world a clear path to fusion power", according to the CFS CEO Bob Mumgaard.

As of October 2024, SPARC was targeted to begin operations in 2026, with the goal of demonstrating net power (Q > 1) in 2027. CFS also plans to build a power plant based on the ARC design at the beginning of the 2030s. Both SPARC and ARC plan to use deuterium-tritium fuel, which produces helium as a by-product.

SPARC is predicted to have a burning plasma. That means that the fusion process would be predominantly self-heating. As of April 2026, Mumgaard described SPARC as 75% complete, and expected it to turn on in 2027.

== See also ==
- General Fusion
- Helium production in the United States
- List of fusion experiments
- List of nuclear fusion companies
- Tokamak Energy
