= Milestone-Based Fusion Development Program =

United States Department of Energy program

The Milestone-Based Fusion Development Program is an ongoing program under the United States Department of Energy, Office of Fusion Energy Sciences to support the development of a fusion pilot plant (FPP) and commercialization of fusion power. As of 2024, eight private companies have received commitments for a total of $46 million for the first 18-month period of performance. The program is planned to run for five years and culminate in one or more preliminary engineering designs for a fusion pilot plant.

== History ==
The need for a fusion pilot plant has been recognized throughout the program to develop fusion power. Most recently before the announcement of the Milestone-Based Fusion Development Program, in 2021 the National Academies of Sciences, Engineering, and Medicine (NASEM) released a report which highlighted the need for such a program and advised its creation. In 2022 the Biden Administration and DOE announced a Bold Decadal Vision for Commercial Fusion Energy, which included plans for a pilot-plant development program.

The Funding Opportunity Announcement (FOA) was announced by the US Department of Energy in September 2022, and $50 million was allocated for the first 18 months of the program. Applications were received in December 2022. Eight companies were selected for award negotiations in May 2023. However, agreements were not signed with the awardees until more than a year later in June 2024, reportedly due to concerns over how intellectual property would be handled.

In June 2024, at a White House Summit, the Department of Energy announced that all eight companies had successfully concluded detailed milestones negotiations with the federal government and that agreements had been signed to commence the Milestone Program.

== Awardees ==
The eight awardees are:

- Commonwealth Fusion Systems (Cambridge, MA)
- Focused Energy, Inc. (Austin, TX)
- Thea Energy, Inc. (formerly Princeton Stellarators, Inc., Branchburg, NJ)
- Realta Fusion, Inc. (Madison, WI)
- Tokamak Energy, Inc. (US subsidiary of UK-based company, Bruceton Mills, WV)
- Type One Energy Group (Madison, WI)
- Xcimer Energy Corp. (Denver, CO)
- Zap Energy, Inc. (Everett, WA)

Awardees' approaches vary, including the tokamak (2 firms), the stellarator (2 firms), inertial confinement (2 firms), the magnetic mirror (1 firm), and the z-pinch (1 firm).

== Structure ==
The program is structured as a public–private partnership between the DOE and the awardees. The companies receive federal payments upon completing quantitative milestones, up to the full award amount.

The program is structured in three periods of performance: One spanning the first 18 months, one spanning the second 18 months, and one spanning the remaining 24 months of the five-year term. The first period of performance will presumably end around the end of 2025, assuming a start date based on the June 2024 announcement.

Only the first period of performance has been announced and awarded. The $46 million number is for the first period of performance. Subsequent periods of performance have not as of 2024 been announced or awarded.

The applicants were encouraged to propose collaborations with US national laboratories, with which the awardees would contract separately and pay directly. For example, Oak Ridge National Laboratory will work with six of the eight companies.

== Milestones ==
As of January 2025, the DOE has announced that at least 3 companies have completed at least 5 scientific and technical milestones. While the specific milestones are typically protected information of the company, the following were announced. There may be more milestones that have been completed:

- Computational modeling for a high-gain target design for laser-driven inertial fusion energy (Focused Energy)
- Demonstration of ion-beam focusing to support fast-ignition approach to inertial fusion energy (Focused Energy)
- Whole-device modeling of simple mirror equilibria to enable scientific energy gains of at least 5 for the tandem-mirror approach to fusion energy (Realta Fusion)
- Down selection to a family of optimized stellarator equilibria taking into account multiple factors of plasma confinement, stability, and stellarator components and subsystems (Thea Energy)
- Engineering design, prototyping, and operation of a single, high-temperature-superconducting magnet coil that is the building block of Thea Energy's approach to generating 3-dimensional, optimized stellarator fields using only planar coils (Thea Energy)

In December 2025, Thea Energy completed a milestone resulting in the certification of its preconceptual pilot plant design. This was the final major design milestone of the first period of performance.

== Dispute over intellectual property ==
The year-long gap between the announcement of awardees and their signing agreements with the DOE was apparently due to a dispute over how companies' intellectual property would be treated under the award. Reporting stated that the companies' rights to existing and subject intellectual property was inadequately safeguarded under the DOE's initial proposed terms. At the time of the announcement, the total private investment in Commonwealth Fusion Systems was over $2 billion.

== Awardee table ==
Company name	Location	Approach	Initial amount awarded in first period of performance	Project name	Second period of performance announced?
Commonwealth Fusion Systems	Cambridge MA	Tokamak	$15 million increased to $19.5 million	Commercial fusion power on a decadal timescale with the compact, high-field ARC power plant	Yes
Focused energy, Inc.	Austin TX	Inertial confinement fusion	$7.5 million	?	No
Thea Energy, Inc. (formerly Princeton Stellarators, Inc.)	Branchburg NJ	Stellarator	$7.5 million	Stellarator fusion pilot plant enabled by array of planar shaping coils	Yes
Realta Fusion, Inc.	Madison WI	Magnetic mirror	$8.1 million	The high-field axisymmetric mirror on a faster path to fusion energy	Yes
Tokamak Energy (US subsidiary of UK company)	Bruceton Mills WV	Spherical tokamak	$3 million increased to $7.1 million	ST-E1 preliminary design review for a fusion pilot plant	No
Type One Energy Group	Madison WI	Stellarator	$9.5 million	The high-field stellarator path to commercial fusion energy	No
Xcimer Energy Inc.	Redwood City, CA	Inertial confinement fusion	$9 million	IFE pilot plant with a low-cost, high-energy excimer driver and the HYLIFE concept	No
Zap Energy, Inc.	Everett, WA	Z-pinch	$5 millionincreased to $9.5 million	Development of a fusion pilot plant design based on a sheared-flow-stabilized Z pinch	Yes

== See also ==
- List of nuclear fusion companies
