= Zap Energy =

American nuclear fusion energy company

- Type: Private
- Industry: Nuclear power
- Founded: 2017; 9 years ago
- Founders: Benj Conway (President); Brian A. Nelson (CTO); Uri Shumlak (CSO)
- Headquarters: Seattle, Washington, United States
- Number of employees: 150 (2025)
- Website: www.zapenergy.com

Zap Energy is an American privately held company that aims to commercialize both fission and fusion power in compact-scale, liquid-metal-cooled modular energy systems. The company is based in Seattle, Washington, with research facilities nearby in Everett and Mukilteo, Washington. The company is designing and building sodium-cooled fission reactors, while simultaneously scaling their fusion technology to maintain plasma stability at increasingly higher energy levels, with the goal of achieving net energy gain and using it as the basis for a lithium-cooled fusion reactor. The company was co-founded by British entrepreneur and investor Benj Conway (President, CEO), with technologist Brian A. Nelson (Chief Technology Officer), and physicist Uri Shumlak (Chief Science Officer).

== History ==
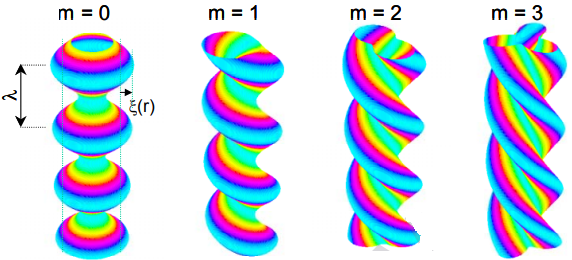
Normal pinch plasma will form instabilities such as the ones shown above, which will disrupt the plasma.

A pinch effect occurs when a current flowing in a conductor produces an inward-directed force, squeezing the conductor. The conductor in pinch fusion is a plasma of fusion fuel (in magneto-inertial fusion it may be an imploding liner). The current is induced using either an external magnet, or directly applied by electrodes in a reaction chamber. The device's relative simplicity led many researchers around the world to build pinch systems.

In early experiments, pinch systems were found to be unstable and the plasma was quickly forced into the walls of the reaction chamber, cooling and quenching the plasma so that fusion does not occur. This led to the development of stabilized pinch machines, most notably ZETA in the United Kingdom. At first, it appeared these designs were free from the instabilities of the earlier devices. However, further investigation showed that new microinstabilities were just as effective at destroying confinement as the earlier, larger, instabilities had been. With no obvious solution to these new class of problems, major research on the classic pinch devices ended by the early 1960s.

The idea of using the flow of the plasma as an added stabilizing force emerged in the 1990s. In this concept, the pinch is developed such that the plasma flows at different, faster speeds at increasing distances from the center of the plasma column, with the outer layers being about ten times as fast as the center. The magnetic field created by the pinch current is a function of both the density and speed of the charges. This causes the resulting pinch field to be non-linear across the plasma column. This surpasses the growth rate of the kink, sausage and interchange instabilities. The exact conditions that need to be reached to stabilize the pinch is an open area of research.

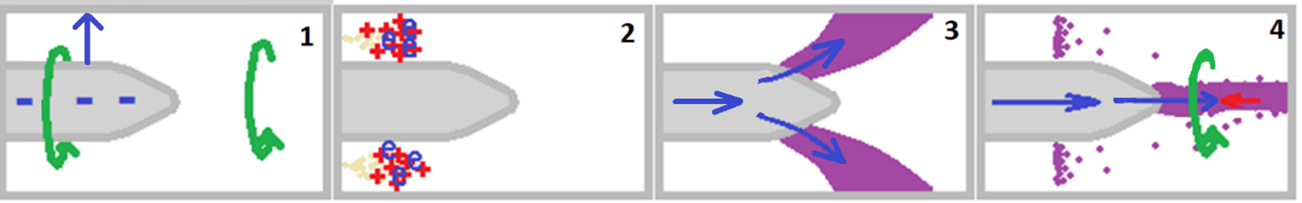
A diagram of the four-step process for pinch assembly. A voltage is applied to the center cathode, which is a copper tube, encased in tungsten carbide. Fusion fuel is pumped into the back of the chamber, and then ionized using Paschen breakdown. A Lorenz force sweeps the ionized plasma forward, assembling the pinch between the cathode and the wall. Current flows from the cathode along the plasma to the grounded end cap, ions move in the other direction.

The conceptual basis for Zap's fusion technology was developed at the University of Washington led by Uri Shumlak. Zap Energy formed following the positive initial results achieved by an experimental device named Fusion Z-pinch Experiment (FuZE) as part of the Advanced Research Projects Agency–Energy (ARPA-E) ALPHA program. Dr. Uri Shumlak and the University of Washington built three experimental machines to test the flowing pinch: ZaP (1998–2012 at UW), ZaP-HD (2012–present at UW), FuZE (2015–2020 at UW; 2021–present at Zap Energy).

Zap Energy was founded in 2017 as a research spin-off from the Fusion Z-pinch Experiment (FuZE) research team at the University of Washington and collaborations with researchers from Lawrence Livermore National Laboratory. Zap Energy then built a next generation fusion core, FuZE-Q (2021–present at Zap Energy). Zap achieved their first fusion reaction as a business in 2018, but in November 2021, Lawrence Livermore National Laboratory provided an independent and more precise measurement of neutron production inside the flowing pinch, proving that the machine can fuse deuterium fuel. The effort was led by ARPA-E, where the agency organized fusion teams to support private fusion companies.

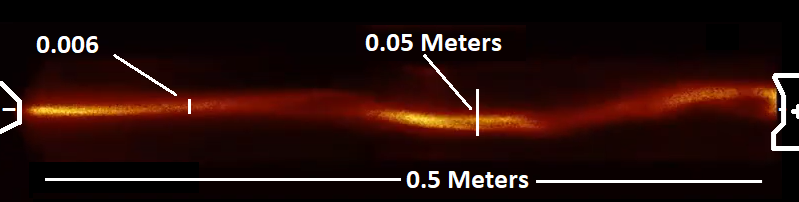
An example of a flowing pinch formed on the FuZE device. Here a pinched plasma 50 cm long and 0.6 cm wide flows across an electrode gap.

2015-2020 From 2015 to 2020, a series of U.S. Department of Energy grants enabled the team to test their sheared-flow-stabilized Z-pinch reactor at progressively higher energy levels. In July 2020, Zap Energy raised $6.5 million in Series A round funding.

2021 In May 2021, Zap closed $27.5 million in Series B funding including from Addition, Energy Impact Partners, Chevron Technology Ventures, and Lowercarbon Capital. Chevron's financing was the first investment in fusion energy by a major U.S. oil company.

2022 In June 2022, Zap Energy announced first plasmas in their breakeven device (FuZE-Q) and a $160 million Series C raise backed by Lowercarbon Capital, Bill Gates's Breakthrough Energy Ventures, Shell PLC, Valor, DCVC, Energy Impact Partners, Chevron, and others. In October 2022, the Centralia Coal Transition Energy Technology Board awarded a $1 million grant to Zap Energy to fund the costs of assessing the feasibility of constructing a Zap fusion energy pilot plant at the site of the TransAlta Big Hanaford gas power plant.

2023 In May 2023, Zap Energy was one of eight companies chosen for the United States Department of Energy Milestone-Based Fusion Development Program. In June 2023, Zap Energy secured significant new repetitive pulsed power manufacturing capabilities by acquiring the liquidated assets of ICAR. Also in June, Zap Energy was selected as a World Economic Forum Technology Unicorn, valued at more than one billion USD.

2024 In April 2024, Zap Energy published a research paper showing that FuZE had demonstrated 1–3 keV plasma electron temperatures (11 to 37 million degrees C), the simplest, smallest, and lowest cost device to do so. In October 2024, the company announced that it closed a $130 million Series D and had begun operating a platform named Century for integrated tests of power plant relevant technologies like repetitive pulsed power and liquid metal walls.

2025 In October 2025, announced that their test rig had delivered more than one hundred plasma shots at the rate of one shot every five seconds, delivering 39 kW.

2026 In March 2026, Zap Energy was named to TIME and Statista’s list of “America’s Top GreenTech Companies of 2026.” The ranking evaluated companies based on environmental impact, innovation, and financial strength. Zap Energy was ranked No. 16 overall, making it the highest-ranked fusion energy company on the list and the top-ranked company headquartered in Washington State. The list included 250 U.S.-based companies across renewable energy, infrastructure, and climate technology sectors. In April 2026, Zap Energy announced that it would be the first company to develop small scale nuclear fission alongside its existing fusion plans. Zap also named Zabrina Johal as the company's new CEO, with cofounder Benj Conway remaining as President.

== Design ==
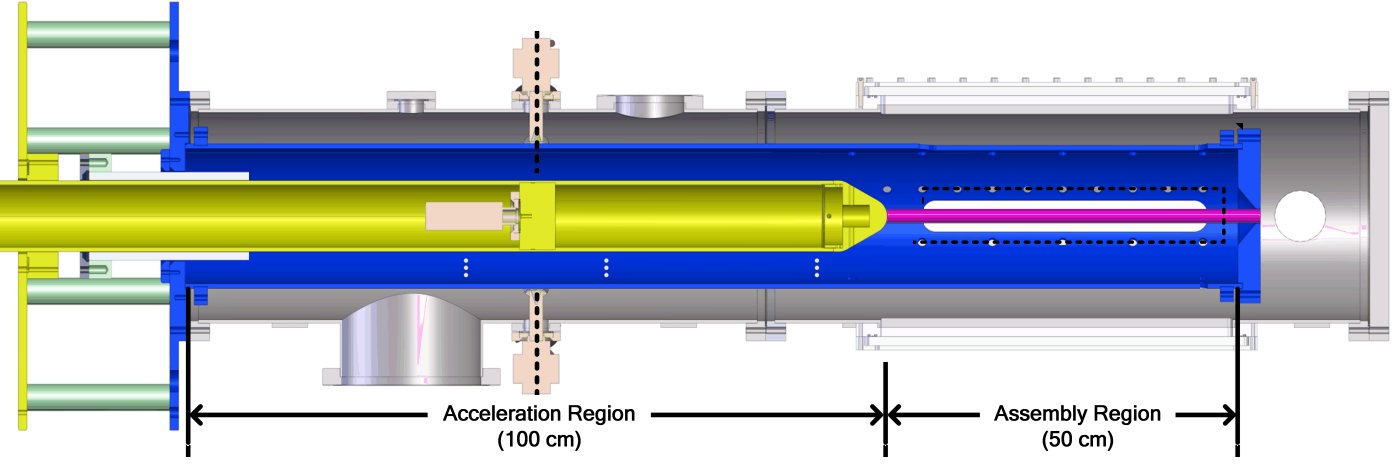
A computer-aided design (CAD) drawing of a sheared-flow stabilized Z pinch device

The Zap Energy reactor is a pulsed power system with no external magnets. The machine is a ~2 meter long metal tube with a cathode running halfway down the middle. A voltage is applied between the central cathode and the grounded wall. Fusion fuel is puffed in the back of the machine, which ionizes due to Paschen breakdown, creating a plasma. This plasma sweeps forward and assembles into a ~50 cm long flowing pinch in the gap between the cathode and the wall.

=== Testing ===
Zap Energy has outfitted these machines with tools to measure the performance of the flowing pinch. These tools include:

- Ion spectroscopy measures the plasma temperature, and in a flowing pinch, also the emissions from Carbon-III impurities inside a plasma.
- High-speed cameras get photos and video of pinch performance. In 2019, the team used a 5 million frame per second camera made by Kirana.
- Interferometry measures the plasma density across the flowing pinch. The tool passes a test laser beam through the plasma and compares it to a reference beam. This tool can measure only densities along the narrow path where the laser travels (termed a Chord).
- Magnetic field probes line the surface of the tube to measure the field generated by the flowing pinch current.

Other diagnostic tools have been used to measure the pinches, many in partnership with experimenters from United States Department of Energy National Laboratories.

=== Scaling up ===
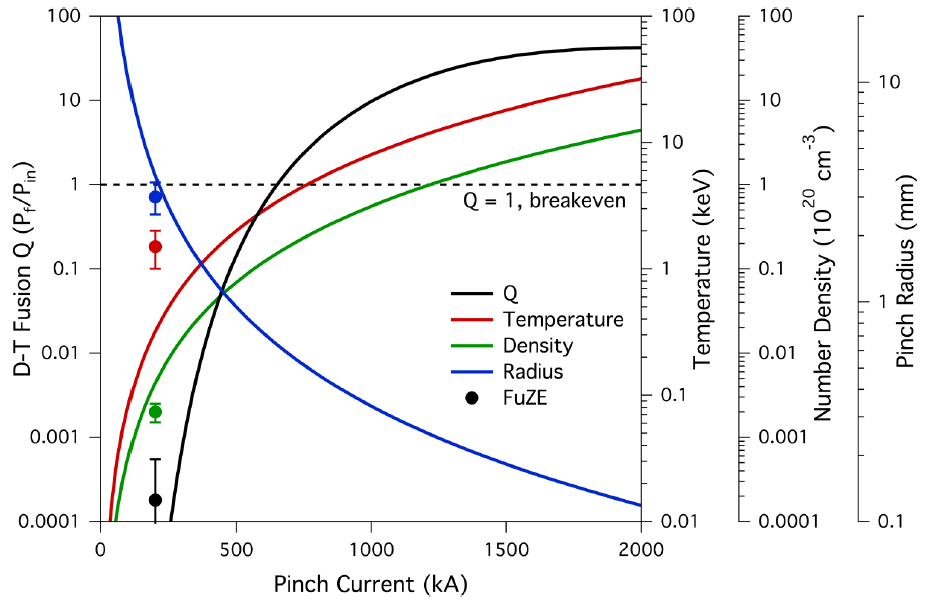
A model of scaling up the current inside the flowing pinch.

Zap Energy argued that the rate of fusion in a flowing pinch scales as the pinch current to the 11th power and that because of this, all that is needed to generate net power from a flowing pinch is higher current. However, this scaling model is based on adiabatic plasmas and that model fails to capture all real-world behavior.

Critics have pointed out that higher currents could introduce drift waves (drift instabilities) and shock waves that could tear the plasma apart. In drift waves, the (+) ions and (−) electrons move at different speeds because of their mass differences, and this disrupts the plasma. Shock waves could form during the pinch assembly process. When the plasma sweeps together at high speeds, the two plasma waves could form a shock wave at higher speeds. Possible solutions include finding other ways to form a pinch plasma.

Supporting simulations suggest that to reach net power, ~650 kiloamps (kA) of current is needed through the flowing pinch. As of late 2021, the company was testing with currents reaching 500 kA.

=== Reactor ===
Zap Energy proposed to surround the pinch with a molten metal blanket to absorb the energetic neutrons emitted by the pinch plasma. The blanket would convert the fusion energy to heat, which could in turn drive a steam turbine. This approach is similar to those proposed for inertial confinement fusion, and by First Light Fusion, General Fusion, several other fusion efforts, and shares several traits with cooling systems proven in operating fission nuclear reactors cooled with liquid metal sodium.

== Challenges ==
The higher pinch currents that are needed for scale-up introduce the possibility of electrode melting and erosion. This kind of erosion has been researched extensively within the field of spacecraft electric propulsion. In 2021, Zap's cathodes were made from copper coated with tungsten carbide, which has a maximum melting point of 3,103 kelvin. Possible solutions include materials like graphene, making machines with bigger spot sizes, active cooling, or other work-around.

Another critique is that the volume of plasma inside the narrow pinch beam is relatively small relative to fusion machines such as magnetic mirrors, tokamaks, or other fusion devices. This caps the amount of fusion fuel, and subsequently, the amount of energy that can be made in a flowing pinch. Possible solutions include higher shot rates, multiple machines, and longer and wider pinch beams.

== See also ==
- History of nuclear fusion
- List of fusion power technologies
- List of nuclear fusion companies
