= HB11 Energy =

Australian fusion energy company

HB11 Energy is a startup company noted for its HB11 Fusion Reactor concept. It developed HB11 laser-based fusion energy technology, which is capable of producing safe and clean energy through the fusion of hydrogen and boron-11 using high-power lasers. The Sydney-based firm is Australia’s first and only fusion energy company. Its founders claim that it is the only company in the world that successfully demonstrated the possibility of hydrogen-boron fusion with lasers.

== History ==
The concept of HB11 fusion was pioneered by Professor Heinrich Hora, whose theoretical work since the 1970s laid the foundation for laser-induced fusion using non-thermal mechanisms. Hora founded HB Energy based on this work in partnership with material scientist Warren McKenzie. The advent of Chirped Pulse Amplification (CPA), a Nobel Prize-winning laser technology developed by Donna Strickland and Gérard Mourou, enabled the high-intensity laser pulses necessary to initiate the HB11 reaction. This breakthrough allowed experimental validation of Hora's theories and led to the establishment of HB11 Energy. In 2022, HB11 successfully demonstrated the world's first non-thermal fusion reactions using high-power lasers, creating ten times more than what was projected.

== Concept ==
HHB11 Energy's technology is drastically different from the conventional nuclear fusion process, which normally involves heating hydrogen isotopes to millions of degrees. Unlike the conventional deuterium-tritium (D-T) fusion, which produces high-energy neutrons and radioactive waste, the HB11 reaction is aneutronic, meaning it does not emit neutrons and thus avoids many of the safety and environmental concerns associated with traditional nuclear energy. The reaction yields three alpha particles (helium nuclei) per fusion event, which can be directly converted into electricity using advanced energy conversion systems, bypassing the need for steam turbines.

HB11 Energy's approach diverges from mainstream fusion efforts such as ITER, which rely on magnetic confinement of superheated plasma. Instead, HB11 employs inertial confinement fusion (ICF) using ultra-short, high-power laser pulses to accelerate hydrogen nuclei into boron-11 targets. Recent research has demonstrated that suprathermal effects—non-equilibrium particle distributions—can lower the temperature threshold for ignition, making the reaction more feasible than previously thought. This has spurred a global movement, with the PROBONO project involving 88 researchers across 27 countries to advance hydrogen-boron fusion technologies.

The fuel used—hydrogen and boron—is abundant and widely available, and the reactor design avoids the complexities of handling radioactive materials. Moreover, the direct conversion of alpha particle energy into electricity could lead to highly efficient power generation systems. A technoeconomic assessment published in the Journal of Fusion Energy claimed that if net energy gain can be achieved, HB11 reactors could be dramatically simpler and safer than D-T fusion reactors, with lower operational costs and minimal environmental impact. Also, HB11 claims that its process does not try to heat fuels to impossibly high temperatures, allowing them to sidestep all scientific challenges that have hindered fusion energy back for more than half a century.

While HB11 fusion technology presents potential as a clean energy solution, it also faces significant scientific and engineering challenges. It still struggles in terms of achieving net energy gain, and the advanced precision required in laser targeting and HB11 Energy maintains that particle acceleration requires continued technological innovation. Unlike conventional deuterium-tritium fusion, HB11 fusion demands ultra-precise laser targeting and particle acceleration to initiate reactions without relying on extreme thermal conditions—a method still in early experimental stages. To address these challenges, the company has initiated several active collaborations with global partners to accelerate the path toward viable HB11 fusion technology. For instance, in December 2024, HB11's partnered with ELI ERIC, the world's largest high-power laser infrastructure provider, to co-develop micro-structured laser targets and diagnostic tools essential for precision laser-matter interaction experiments—critical to HB11's non-thermal fusion approach.

There is also HB11's collaboration with Defence Trailblazer and the University of Adelaide’s DualTech-USPL group in an $8.2 million initiative to commercialize a first-of-its-kind ultra-short pulse laser.
