= Andrew Holland =

- Born: 1979 (age 46–47)
- Education: University of St. Andrews
- Occupations: Journalist; Science communicator; Author; Environmentalist; Climate change activist; Climate change mitigation
- Website: website

Andrew Holland (born 1979) is the founder and CEO of the Fusion Industry Association (FIA), an organization which provides strategic direction for energy policy and advocates for fusion energy. Holland's work focuses on the interconnected issues of national security, energy, climate change, and the environment. Through his speaking and writing, Holland has emerged as a leading voice for sustainable energy security and climate change mitigation.

Andrew Holland was featured on the program Story in the Public Square, which aired on PBS on February 16, 2025, where he discussed fusion energy and its impact on global energy production. His work has appeared in The Guardian, The Christian Science Monitor, The Wall Street Journal, The Washington Examiner and The Washington Post.

== Education and career ==
Holland got B.S. in History and Economics from Wake Forest University in 2001, and an MSc in International Strategy and Economics from the University of St. Andrews in 2006, both in North Carolina.

Throughout his career Holland has been a prominent advocate of sustainable energy security and mitigating climate change.

From 2006 through 2008 he worked for U.S. Senator Chuck Hagel as an Energy and Environmental policy Legislative assistant.

From December 2008 to January 2013 he was a Research Associate at the International Institute for Strategic Studies (IISS) where he managed the "Transatlantic Dialogue on Climate Change and Security".

In May 2011 he joined the American Security Project (ASP) which had been founded in 2006 by Chuck Hegel and John Kerry. He became COO of ASP in 2015 and held this position until he left in May 2021.

In 2021 he joined the Fusion Industry Association (FIA) as its founding CEO and remains there to the present time.

Holland was instrumental in getting the Nuclear Regulatory Commission to separate nuclear fission regulations from nuclear fusion ones.
