= Thea Energy =

American nuclear fusion and energy company

- Formerly: Princeton Stellarators, Inc.
- Type: Private
- Industry: fusion power
- Founded: 2022; 4 years ago
- Headquarters: Kearny, New Jersey, United States
- Key people: Brian Berzin (CEO), David Gates (CTO)
- Number of employees: c. 70 (2025)
- Website: thea.energy

Thea Energy, formerly Princeton Stellarators, Inc (PSI), is an American fusion power company based in New Jersey. The company was founded in 2022 after a spin-off from the Princeton Plasma Physics Laboratory (PPPL) and Princeton University. Thea Energy's approach to commercial fusion is based on a stellarator device using a particular type of all-planar electromagnetic coils, developed by PPPL and licensed by Thea Energy.

== History ==
Lyman Spitzer invented the stellarator in 1951, founding PPPL. However, PPPL was not able to build a stellarator that could effectually confine plasma, and ended its program with the Model C in 1969.

After a three decade gap, PPPL attempted to build another stellarator from 2004. This stellarator, NCSX, would have had non-planar modular coils producing an optimized magnetic field with quasi-axisymmetry. However, it was canceled in 2008 by the US Department of Energy due to budget and schedule overruns.

Subsequent attempts to revive the project directly failed, but led to the development of permanent magnet stellarators at PPPL with otherwise planar coils which fed in to PPPL's spin-off, Thea Energy.

Thea Energy was founded in 2022 as Princeton Stellarators, Inc, based on technology licensed from PPPL.

Thea Energy received two United States Department of Energy INFUSE awards in 2022 and one in 2023.

In May 2023, Thea was one of eight companies chosen for the United States Department of Energy Milestone-Based Fusion Development Program.

In September 2024, Thea Energy announced it had raised US$20 million in a Series A funding round led by Prelude Ventures, with participation from 11.2 Capital, Anglo American, Hitachi Ventures, Lowercarbon Capital, Mercator Partners, Orion Industrial Ventures, and Starlight Ventures. It was reported that proceeds will be used to construct and operate its proprietary superconducting planar coil magnet array systems, support the design and simulation of its large-scale integrated neutron source stellarator Eos, and expand its team.

== Approach ==
The first stellarator configuration with all-planar coils was the heliac, developed in the early 1980s. The first heliac experiment was SHEILA, built at the ANU in Australia and operated from 1984. The heliac's coils were all-planar and all-circular, but did not have optimization for reduced neoclassical transport.

Thea Energy's approach is to use arrays of two different types of coil to achieve quasi-axisymmetry, a form of optimization that reduces neoclassical transport. One array is circular and the other non-circular, but both are planar. This approach is intended to simplify the design relative to non-planar modular coils pioneered on Wendelstein 7-AS and subsequently deployed on the optimized stellarator Wendelstein 7-X. They also allow real time control of the resultant magnetic field, and increased access for system maintenance.

As an intermediate step towards a fusion power plant, Thea is building Eos, a neutron source based on the same technology. Eos is intended to demonstrate the technology and generate near-term revenue. It is expected to run sub-breakeven in energy output, but to emit large fluxes of neutrons to produce radionuclides (radioisotopes) such as tritium and medical radioisotopes. The fuel for the neutron source will be deuterium rather than a mix of deuterium and tritium.

== See also ==
- List of nuclear fusion companies
- Wendelstein 7-X
- Plasma stability
