= Helion Energy =

American fusion research company

Helion Energy, Inc.

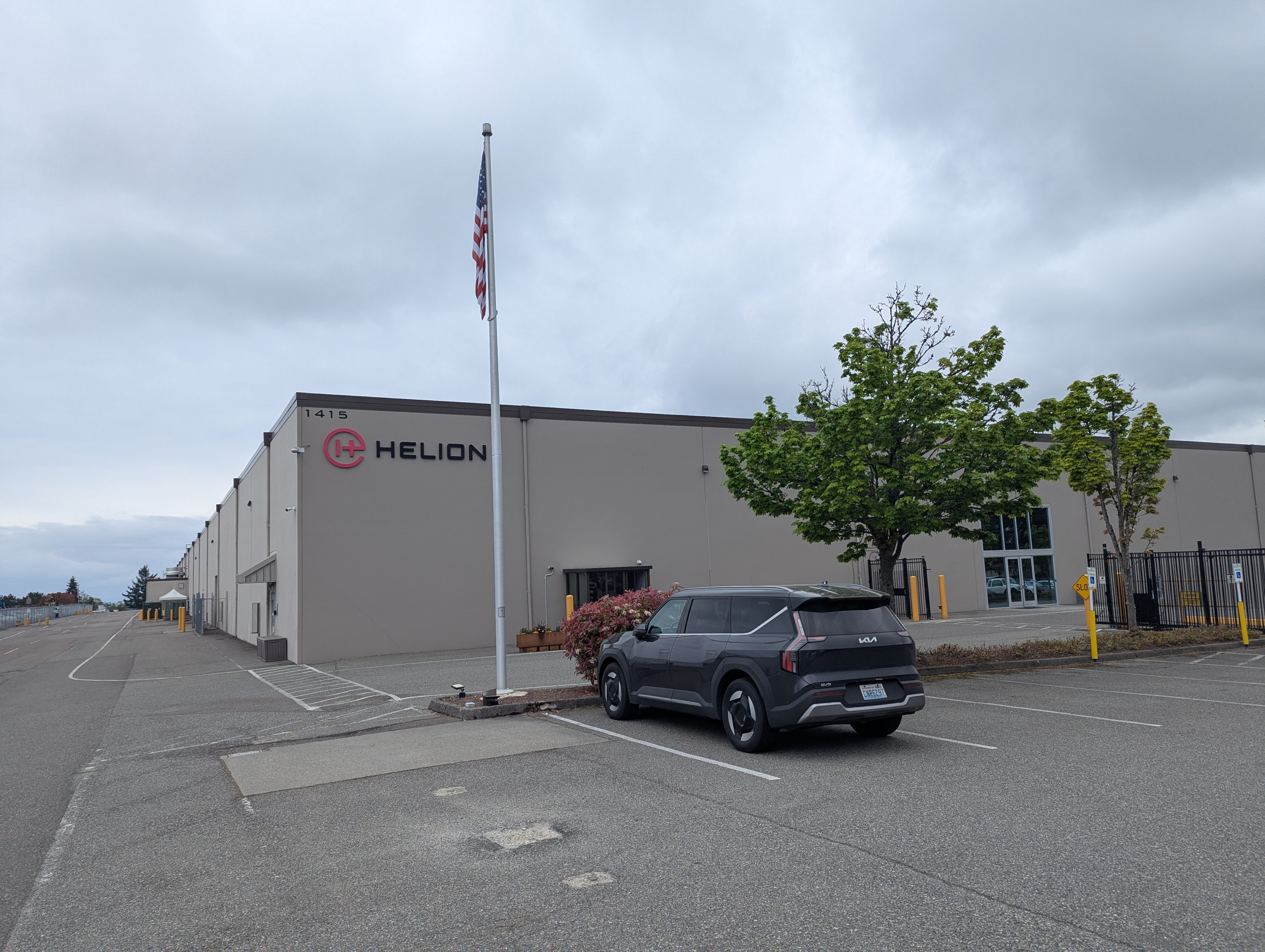
- Helion Energy facility in Everett, Washington
- Type: Private
- Industry: Fusion power
- Founded: 2013; 13 years ago
- Founders: David Kirtley; John Slough; Chris Pihl; George Votroubek
- Headquarters: Everett, Washington, U.S.
- Key people: David Kirtley (CEO); Sam Altman (chairman); Chris Pihl (CTO); George Votroubek (principal scientist)
- Number of employees: 800 (2026)
- Website: www.helionenergy.com

Helion Energy, Inc. is an American fusion research company located in Everett, Washington. It is developing a magneto-inertial fusion technology to produce fusion power by combining deuterium with helium-3 via aneutronic fusion.

== History ==
The company was founded in 2013 by David Kirtley, John Slough, Chris Pihl, and George Votroubek.

In 2013, Helion was selected as a finalist in the Clean Tech Open, a nonprofit accelerator program supporting early-stage clean technology companies. The recognition highlighted the company's early work in magneto-inertial fusion and its potential applications for commercial electricity generation.

In 2015, Helion participated in the Y Combinator startup accelerator as part of its Summer 2013 (S14) batch.

The management team were awarded a 2015 ARPA-E ALPHA contract, "Staged Magnetic Compression of FRC Targets to Fusion Conditions".

Helion Energy has been named a finalist for multiple GeekWire Awards, including Innovation of the Year (2022), Workplace of the Year (2023), and Sustainable Innovation of the Year (2025 and 2026).

On May 10, 2023, Helion Energy announced that its plant was "expected to be online by 2028 and will target power generation of 50 MW or greater after a 1-year ramp up period". This is the first commercial agreement for fusion energy.

In October 2023, Helion and Nucor Corporation, the largest steel producer and recycler in North America, agreed to develop a 500-MWe fusion power plant at one of Nucor's manufacturing facilities. Their target for beginning operations is 2030.

In 2026, Time named Helion to its TIME100 Most Influential Companies list, citing the company's progress toward commercial fusion power through its planned Orion power plant and Polaris fusion milestones. In February its Polaris prototype achieved two firsts for private fusion:

- Demonstrated measurable deuterium-tritium (D-T) fusion.
- Reached record plasma temperatures of 150 million degrees Celsius

In June, Helion became the first to clear key Washington state regulatory licenses for handling radioactive materials in preparation for its Orion power plant in Malaga and raised a total of $500M in Series G funding, led by Thrive Capital, valuing the company at $15.5 billion.

== Technology ==
Helion's approach uses a linear fusion system with pulsed magnetic compression and differs from the traditional design for fusion reactions, which relies on tokamaks.

The system is intended to operate at 1 Hz, injecting plasma, compressing it to fusion conditions, expanding it, and recovering the energy to produce electricity. The pulsed-fusion system used is said to be theoretically capable of running 24/7 for electricity production. Due to its compact size, the systems would be able to replace current fossil fuel infrastructure without major needs for investment.

=== Fuel ===
Helion uses a combination of deuterium and Helium-3 (^{3}He) as fuel. Deuterium and ^{3}He allows mostly aneutronic fusion, releasing only 5% of its energy in the form of fast neutrons. Commercial ^{3}He is rare and expensive. Instead Helion plans to produce ^{3}He by deuteron–deuteron (D–D) side reactions to the D–^{3}He reactions. D–D fusion has an equal chance of producing a ^{3}He atom and of producing a tritium (^{3}H) atom plus a proton. Tritium beta decays into more ^{3}He with a half-life of 12.32 years. Helion plans to capture the ^{3}He produced this way and reuse it as fuel. Helion has a patent on this process.

=== Development history ===
The company's fusion generator is based on the inductive plasmoid accelerator (IPA) experiments performed from 2005 through 2012. These experiments used deuterium–deuterium fusion, which produced a 2.45-MeV neutron in half of the reactions. The IPA experiments claimed 300 km/s velocities, deuterium neutron production, and 2-keV deuterium ion temperatures. Helion and MSNW LLC published articles describing a deuterium–tritium (D–T) implementation that is the easiest to achieve but generates 14 MeV neutrons. The Helion team published peer-reviewed research demonstrating D–D neutron production in 2011.

==== 5th prototype, 'Venti' ====
In 2018, the 5th prototype, Venti, had magnetic fields of 7 T and at high density, an ion temperature of 2 keV. Helion detailed D–D fusion experiments producing neutrons in an October 2018 report at the United States Department of Energy's ARPA-E's annual ALPHA program meeting. Experiments that year achieved plasmas with multi-keV temperatures and a triple product of 6.4 × 10^{18} keV·s/m^{3}.

==== 6th prototype, 'Trenta' ====
In 2021, the firm announced that after a 16-month test cycle with more than 10,000 pulses, its sixth prototype, Trenta, had reached 100 million degrees C, the minimum temperature where a commercial generator could run. This made Helion the first private fusion company to reach these temperatures. Magnetic compression fields exceeded 8 T, ion temperatures surpassed 8 keV, and electron temperatures exceeded 1 keV. The company further reported ion densities up to 3 × 10^{22} ions/m^{3} and confinement times of up to 0.5 ms.

==== 7th prototype, 'Polaris' ====
Helion's seventh-generation prototype, Polaris, started in 2011 and completed in 2024. The device is expected to increase the pulse rate from one pulse every 10 minutes to one pulse per second for short periods. This prototype is expected to be able to heat fusion plasma up to temperatures greater than 100 million degrees C. Polaris is planned to be 25% larger than Trenta to ensure that ions do not damage the vessel walls. In August 2024, Helion received a Large Broad Scope license from Washington State Department of Health. This allowed Helion to possess and use necessary quantities of byproduct material to support the operation of Polaris.

Helion completed construction of its seventh-generation prototype, Polaris, in late 2024 and began initial operations. While the company's original 2021 target was to demonstrate net electricity production in 2024, this milestone was not met. In July 2025, Helion said the company hoped to demonstrate electricity generation from fusion using Polaris as early as that year. Helion achieved 150 million degrees C D–T fusion as of February 13, 2026.

==== 8th prototype, 'Orion' ====
As of January 2022, an eighth iteration was in the design stage. In July 2025, Helion announced plans to build a 50-megawatt fusion plant at property owned by the public utility district operators of Rock Island Dam near Malaga, in Chelan County, Washington. The company said the plant is planned to be operational by 2028, supplying power to nearby Microsoft datacenters. In June, 2026, the company revised its predictions: "We will not, in no universe, have 50 megawatts hit full operation in 2028... Full power won't come before 2029 or 2030".

In May, then-Governor of Washington Bob Ferguson signed into law House Bill 1018. This bill classified fusion as a clean energy source and legally distinguished it from traditional nuclear fission. The bill gave Helion Energy the ability to pursue a local permitting option to gain approval for its proposed plant site in Chelan County.

==== Overview ====
Prototype	Year developed	Notable features	Achievements
Inductive Plasmoid Accelerator (IPA) (1,2,3)	2005–2012	Deuterium–deuterium fusion	Achieved 300 km/s velocities, deuterium neutron production, and 2 keV deuterium ion temperatures.
Grande (4th)	2014	High field operation, magnetic field compression of 4 tesla, forms cm-scale FRCs, plasma temperatures of 5 keV	Outperformed any other private fusion company at the time. Demonstrated the first direct magnetic energy recovery from a subscale pulsed magnetic system with over 95% round-trip efficiency for over 1 million pulses.
Venti (5th)	2018	Magnetic fields of 7 T, high-density ion temperature of 2 keV	Detailed D–D fusion experiments producing neutrons. Achieved plasmas with multi-keV temperatures and a triple product of 6.4 × 10^{18} keV·s/m^{3}.
Trenta (6th)	2021	Magnetic compression fields over 8 T, ion temperatures over 8 keV, electron temperatures over 1 keV	Achieved 100 million degrees C after a 16-month test cycle with more than 10,000 pulses. Reported ion densities up to 3 × 10^{22} ions/m^{3} and confinement times of up to 0.5 ms.
Polaris (7th)	In operation as of January 2025	Expected to increase the pulse rate, heat fusion plasma up to temperatures greater than 100 million degrees C, 25% larger than Trenta	Achieved 150 million degrees C D–T fusion.
Orion	Under construction since July 2025	Not Published	Department of Health licenses and generator building permits received in June 2026.

== Funding ==
Helion Energy received $7 million in funding from NASA, the United States Department of Energy and the Department of Defense, followed by $1.5 million from the private sector in August 2014, through the seed accelerators Y Combinator and Mithril Capital Management.

In 2021, the company was valued at 3 billion dollars. As of late 2021, investment totaled $77.8 million. In November 2021, Helion received $500 million in Series E funding, with an additional $1.7 billion of commitments tied to specific milestones. The funding was mainly led by Sam Altman, CEO of OpenAI, who is also the executive chairman of Helion.

As of January 2025, after a $425 million Series F funding round, Helion Energy was valued at $5.4 billion. Investors in the company grew to include Nucor Corporation, Lightspeed, SoftBank Group's Vision Fund 2, and a university endowment.

In September 2026, Helion closed a $500 million oversubsribed Series G funding round, increased from the $465 million announced in June.

In October 2026, Helion signed a letter of intent with the United States Department of Commerce for up to $225 million in funding under the CHIPS and Science Act to support domestic development and manufacturing of high-voltage semiconductors for fusion power systems, with $175 million from federal funding and $50 million in additional private investement. The expected federal funding would be accompanied by $50 million in additional private investment, bringing the combined funding to up to $225 million.

== Criticism ==
Retired Princeton Plasma Physics Laboratory researcher Daniel Jassby mentioned Helion Energy in a letter included in the American Physical Society newsletter Physics & Society (April 2019) as being among fusion start-ups allegedly practicing "voodoo fusion" rather than legitimate science. He noted that the company is one of several that has continually claimed "power in 5 to 10 years, but almost all have apparently never produced a single D–D fusion reaction".

The same 2018 MITRE/JASON report commissioned by ARPA-E evaluated Helion’s approach and identified the key technical challenge as “whether they can simultaneously achieve sufficiently high compression while maintaining plasma stability”.

== See also ==
- List of nuclear fusion companies
- Fusion Industry Association
- General Fusion
- TAE Technologies
