= Malaga, Washington =

Unincorporated community in Washington, United States

- Unincorporated community
- Location within Washington (state)
- Coordinates: 47°22′20″N 120°12′04″W
- Country: United States
- State: Washington
- County: Chelan
- Elevation: 682 ft (208 m)
- Time zone: UTC-8 (Pacific (PST))
  - Summer (DST): UTC-7 (PDT)
- ZIP code: 98828
- Area code: 509
- GNIS feature ID: 1522655

Malaga is an unincorporated community in Chelan County, Washington, United States. Founded in 1903, Malaga is located on the Columbia River 6.5 miles (10.5 km) east-southeast of Wenatchee. Malaga has a post office with ZIP code 98828.

== Economy ==
In 2025, following permitting and the completion of Washington State environmental review process, Helion Energy began to build a commercial fusion power plant facility. The Orion fusion plant is planned to provide at least 50 MW of power, directly to Microsoft data centers, under a power purchase agreement that begins in 2028. (Note: Full 50 MW power production may begin in 2029) Helion will employ 10 to 50 people at the facility.
