= Shine Technologies =

American company

- Type: private
- Industry: Radiopharmaceutical
- Founded: June 2010; 16 years ago
- Founder: Gregory Piefer
- Headquarters: Janesville, Wisconsin
- Key people: Gregory Piefer (founder, CEO); Ross Radel (CTO); Ray Rothrock (director); Paul Ryan (director)
- Number of employees: 270 (2024)
- Website: www.shinefusion.com

Shine Technologies (stylized as SHINE Technologies) is a private corporation based in Janesville, Wisconsin. Shine Technologies applies nuclear fusion and advanced separation techniques for various material transmutation, including nondestructure testing, radiation hardening services for industrial and defense applications, and production of radioisotopes for cancer treatment.

Shine is also engaged in research and development for recycling nuclear fuel, and aspires in phase 4 to produce economical fusion energy resulting from continuous reinvestment of a portion of its earnings from earlier phase businesses. Shine's key differentiator versus other fusion companies is that its business model is focused on achieving economic breakeven for fusion, rather than scientific or engineering breakeven for fusion energy.

== History ==
Shine Technologies originated from Phoenix Nuclear Labs, founded by Dr. Gregory Piefer in 2005. The company was founded on the idea that the fastest path to achieving economically viable fusion energy was to commercialize near-term applications that allowed for improvement by practice and reinvestment. Phoenix initially pioneered fusion-based technology for industrial nondestructive testing, establishing a foundation in solid and then gas-target neutron generation with the goal to increase target temperature over time that will lead to more efficient fusion yields.

In 2010, Shine Medical Technologies was spun off, focusing on medical isotope production using fusion technology.

In 2013, Shine Technologies constructed a full-scale prototype fusion device at its Monona, Wisconsin facility, proving the feasibility of its fusion neutron generator.

An independent validation by Argonne National Laboratory in June 2015 confirmed that Shine's production, separation, and purification process could generate Mo-99, meeting strict purity standards of the British Pharmacopoeia.

In 2016, the Nuclear Regulatory Commission (NRC) granted a construction permit for Shine's Janesville facility, known as the Chrysalis.

In July 2019, Shine Technologies and Phoenix Nuclear Labs collaboratively set a world record for the strongest sustained nuclear fusion reaction in a steady-state system.

In 2021, Shine Technologies reacquired Phoenix Nuclear Labs to integrate their fusion technology and isotope production capabilities. This merger marked the transition from Shine Medical Technologies LLC to Shine Technologies LLC, reflecting its broader focus within the nuclear technology sector.

In 2023, Shine Technologies captured the first-ever image of Cherenkov radiation from a commercial fusion device, validating their beam-target fusion technology and attracting more investment.

In 2023, the NRC issued both its final supplemental environmental impact statement and Final Safety Evaluation Report for the Chrysalis, concluding that there were no safety aspects precluding the issuance of the license for operation.

In 2024, Shine Technologies submitted a Drug Master File to the FDA for non-carrier-added lutetium-177, a radiopharmaceutical used in precision cancer treatment.

== Products and services ==
=== Medical isotopes ===
Shine Technologies plans to produce a range of isotopes, especially focused on those that are produced with neutrons such as Molybdenum-99 (Mo-99), which is used to create Tc-99m for diagnostic scans. Shine's fusion-driven Mo-99 production technology expects to reduce nuclear waste and improve reliability compared to traditional methods. This approach uses fusion-driven sub-critical targets and allows for the reuse of low-enriched uranium. Shine's Chrysalis facility incorporates multiple production systems to ensure continued supply of radioisotopes even if one accelerator is offline.

Shine also produces n.c.a. Lutetium-177, a radioactive isotope used in targeted cancer therapy and its precursor material ytterbium-176 (Yb-176). In 2024, Shine submitted a Drug Master File to the FDA for n.c.a. Lu-177 and opened Cassiopeia, North America's largest Lu-177 processing facility, with an initial production capacity of 100,000 doses per year, expandable to 200,000 doses. Producing Lu-177 in North America reduces transit times and minimizes decay losses during shipping. Today, Shine uses neutrons from external reactors to irradiate Yb-176, but anticipates that it will switch to internal sources as its Chrysalis facility comes online.

=== Radiation effects testing ===
Shine Technologies offers Fusion Linear Accelerator for Radiation Effects Testing (FLARE), providing high fluence 14 MeV neutrons for testing the reliability of components under radiation. This service is used in various fusion technology applications including materials validation and breeder blanket development, as well as defense and commercial rad-hardness testing.

== Facilities ==
Shine Technologies operates several facilities:

- Chrysalis – Currently under construction at the Janesville, Wisconsin campus, it is planned to serve as a flexible irradiation source and a site for producing fission and neutron capture based isotopes (including molybdenum-99 and lutetium-177). Chrysalis will use Shine's fusion technology to drive much of the irradiation process, and the facility will house several fusion based neutron generators.
- Cassiopeia – Opened in 2024 at the Janesville campus, it is the largest production facility for non-carrier-added lutetium-177 (n.c.a. Lu-177) in North America, with a capacity of up to 100,000 patient doses per year.
- Building One – Shine's research and development proving ground, Building One is where Shine's high output DT fusion sources were first demonstrated and where its commercial Lu-177 processing technology was developed. It also serves as the operating location for the FLARE rad-effects testing business.
- Heliopolis – Located in Fitchburg, Wisconsin, this facility houses the Shine internal systems and manufacturing organization. This is where Shine manufactures internal equipment for fusion and nuclear technology manufacturing.
- Veendam, Netherlands – Shine has a small office here with plans to establish irradiation and isotope production facilities, marking the company's expansion into the European market.

== Business strategy ==
Shine Technologies employs a four-phased business strategy aimed at leveraging current fusion technology for revenue generation and reinvestment that enable steady and sustainable progress towards commercial fusion energy.

- Phase 1: Neutron testing – This phase uses fusion technology for non-destructive testing in industries such as aerospace, defense, and energy, and includes neutron imaging and rad-effects testing. Today, the neutron imaging service is operated through Shine's sister company, Phoenix Neutron Imaging. These services, historically provided by aged fission reactors are now being transitioned to Shine's fusion-based technologies.
- Phase 2: Medical isotope production – Shine focuses on producing neutron-based isotopes including molybdenum-99 (Mo-99) for medical imaging and non-carrier-added lutetium-177 (n.c.a. Lu-177) for cancer treatment. Its goal over time is to reduce the world's reliance on fission reactors by replacing that capacity with fusion-based neutron generation, as it has already demonstrated in phase 1.
- Phase 3: Recycling nuclear waste – Shine plans to build a pilot plant for recycling used nuclear fuel from light water reactors, utilizing fusion neutron generation technology to transmute long-lived isotopes into shorter-lived or stable elements. The pilot plant is designed to be proliferation resistant initially targeting a modified PUREX process called codecontamination (CoDCon) for uranium/plutonium recycle, along with an actinide-lanthanide separation (ALSEP) process to isolate minor actinides for future transmutation. The process for recycling waste mirrors the isotope production and separation process used in Shine's Chrysalis facility. Fusion transmutation facilities in phase 3 are expected to be similar to devices planned for fusion energy while operating at much lower operational uptime, not needing to be Q>1, and receiving higher payment per reaction versus fusion energy.
- Phase 4: Commercial fusion energy – The ultimate goal of Shine is to achieve commercially viable fusion energy generation, building on the knowledge, technology, and experience developed in the previous phases.

== See also ==
- List of nuclear fusion companies
