= Magnetized liner inertial fusion =

Method of producing controlled nuclear fusion

The stages of a MagLIF implosion.: 1. A laser preheats the fuel.; 2. An axial current is driven through the liner.; 3. The current induces an azimuthal magnetic field.; 4. The magnetic force implodes the liner, compressing and further heating the fuel.

Magnetized liner inertial fusion (MagLIF) is an ongoing Z-pinched-fusion power experiment being carried out on the Z Pulsed Power Facility (Z-machine) at Sandia National Laboratories in New Mexico, United States. It is one example of the broader magneto-inertial fusion approach, which attempts to compress a pre-heated plasma. The goal is to produce fusion conditions without the level of compression needed in the inertial confinement fusion (ICF) approach, where the required densities reach about 100 times that of lead.

The term MagLIF may also be used more broadly to refer to machines that use the same operating principle as the one at the Z machine. This includes the Primary Test Stand (PTS) in Mianyang, China.

== Description ==
MagLIF is a method of generating energy by magnetically compressing a cylinder of fusion fuel (such as deuterium). First, an axial magnetic field of 10–20 tesla is applied to the fuel. Then, a multi-kilojoule laser shines through the fuel, preheating it to a few million degrees Celsius and turning it into a plasma. Finally, a 100 nanosecond pulse of electric current is driven axially through the metal liner surrounding the fuel. The current induces an intense Z-pinch magnetic field that crushes the liner and fuel.

The compression does work to the fuel, heating it to tens of millions of degrees Celsius. Normally the electrons in the plasma would be free to escape, and the ions to a lesser extent, carrying away energy and cooling the plasma. The compression also amplifies the axial magnetic field to thousands of teslas, providing magnetic confinement to the imploded plasma and trapping the fuel and its heat. Ideally, the plasma reaches a high enough temperature and density to undergo fusion burn, releasing energy.

MagLIF has characteristics of both inertial confinement fusion (due to the use of a laser and pulsed compression) and magnetic confinement fusion (due to the use of a powerful magnetic field to inhibit thermal conduction and contain the plasma), making it an example of magneto-inertial fusion.

In results published in 2012, a computer simulation using the LASNEX code showed that a 70 megaampere facility would provide an energy yield of 1000 times the expended energy, and a 60 megaampere facility would produce a yield of 100 times the expended energy.

== Z Pulsed Power Facility ==
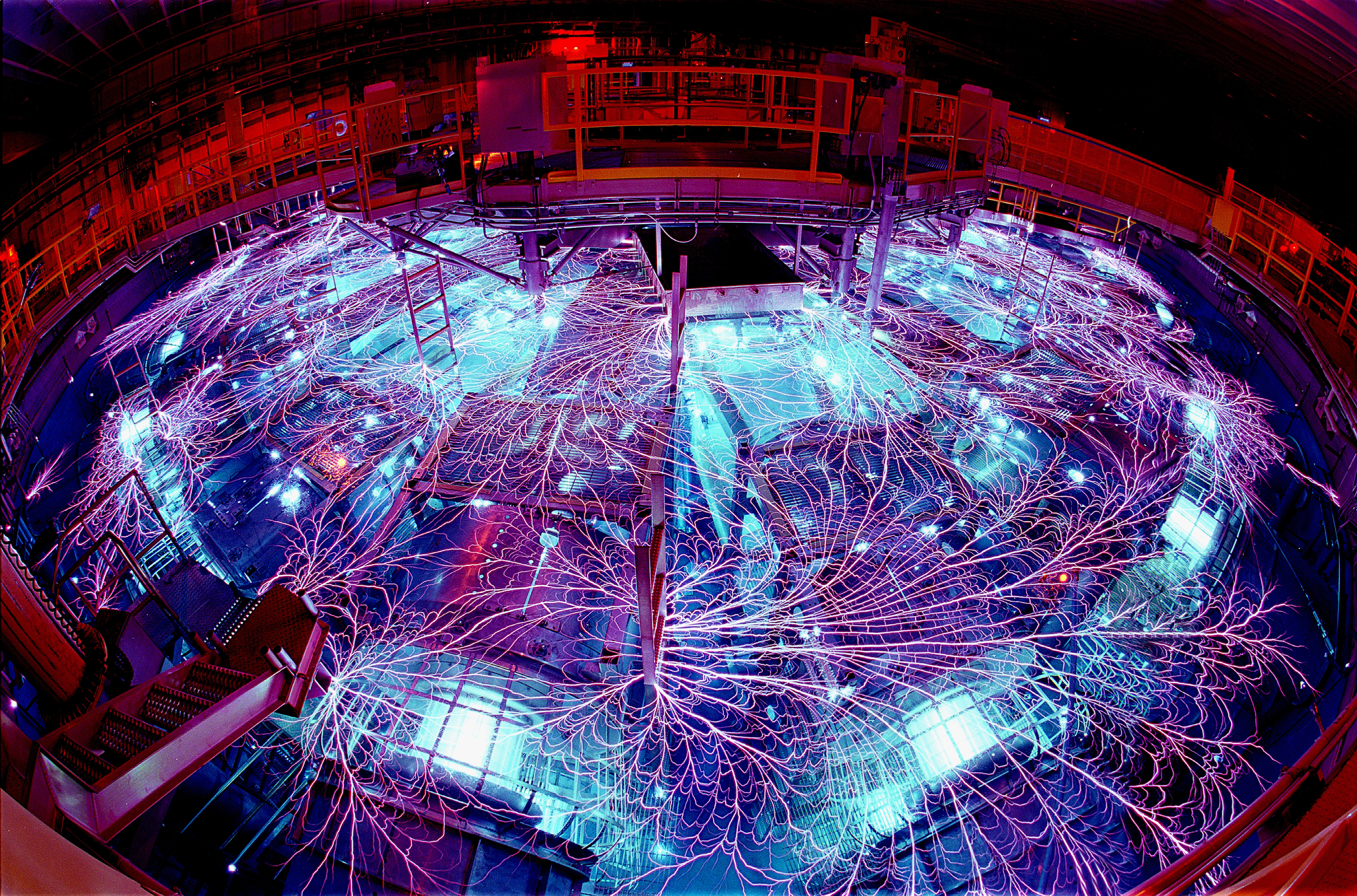
The Z machine at Sandia National Labs

Sandia National Labs is currently exploring the potential for this method to generate energy by utilizing the Z machine. The Z machine is capable of 27 megaamperes and may be capable of producing slightly more than breakeven energy while helping to validate the computer simulations. The Z-machine conducted MagLIF experiments in November 2013 with a view towards breakeven experiments using D–T fuel in 2018.

Sandia Labs planned to proceed to ignition experiments after establishing the following:

1. That the liner will not break apart too quickly under the intense energy. This has been apparently confirmed by recent experiments. This hurdle was the biggest concern regarding MagLIF following its initial proposal.
2. That laser preheating is able to correctly heat the fuel—to be confirmed by experiments starting in December 2012.
3. That magnetic fields generated by a pair of coils above and below the hohlraum can serve to trap the preheated fusion fuel and importantly inhibit thermal conduction without causing the target to buckle prematurely—to be confirmed by experiments starting in December 2012.

Following these experiments, an integrated test started in November 2013. The test yielded about 100 billion high-energy neutrons.

As of November 2013, the facility at Sandia labs had the following capabilities:

1. 10 tesla magnetic field
2. 2 kilojoule laser
3. 16 megaamperes
4. D–D fuel

In 2014, the test yielded up to 2×10^{12} D–D neutrons under the following conditions:

1. 10 tesla magnetic field
2. 2.5 kilojoule laser
3. 19 megaamperes
4. D–D fuel

Experiments aiming for energy breakeven with D-T fuel were expected to occur in 2018.
To achieve scientific breakeven, the facility is going through a 5-year upgrade to:

1. 30 teslas
2. 8 kilojoule laser
3. 27 megaamperes
4. D–T fuel handling

In 2019, after encountering significant problems related to mixing of imploding foil with fuel and helical instability of plasma, the tests yielded up to 3.2 trillion neutrons under the following conditions:

1. 1.2 kilojoule laser
2. 18 megaamperes

In 2020, "the burn-averaged ion temperature doubled to 3.1 keV and the primary deuterium–deuterium neutron yield increased by more than an order of magnitude to 1.1×10^{13} (2 kilojoule deuterium–tritium equivalent) through a simultaneous increase in the applied magnetic field (from 10.4 to 15.9 teslas), laser preheat energy (from 0.46 to 1.2 kilojoules), and current coupling (from 16 to 20 megaamperes)."

== See also ==
- National Ignition Facility
- Pacific Fusion
- Pinch (plasma physics)
- Zap Energy
