= First Light Fusion =

British fusion research company

First Light Fusion Ltd
- Type: Private
- Industry: Fusion power
- Founded: 2011; 15 years ago
- Founder: Dr Nicholas Hawker; Prof Yiannis Ventikos
- Headquarters: Oxford, United Kingdom
- Key people: Mark Thomas (CEO); David Bryon (CFO); Ryan Ramsey (COO); Bart Markus (Chairman)
- Number of employees: c. 80 (2025)
- Website: firstlightfusion.com

First Light Fusion Ltd is a British inertial confinement fusion research company based in Oxfordshire, England. The company was founded in 2011 as the first private fusion company in the UK researching fusion energy via inertial confinement.

== History ==
First Light Fusion was founded by Dr Nicholas Hawker and his former academic adviser Professor Yiannis Ventikos in 2011, as a research spin-off at the University of Oxford. Ventikos had suggested forming the firm based on Hawker's research into hydrodynamic simulations of shock-driven cavity collapse. Part of Hawker's PhD research had involved studying the cavity collapse caused by a pistol shrimp's claw. The firm initially raised seed money from IP Group, Parkwalk Advisors, and several angel investors.

In April 2022, the firm announced it had demonstrated fusion using a projectile driver method and its amplifier technology in November 2021. The result was validated by the United Kingdom Atomic Energy Authority (UKAEA).

In January 2023, it was announced that the firm had entered an agreement with the UK Atomic Energy Authority to develop the largest pulsed power machine in the world, named Machine 4, at UKAEA in Culham, Oxfordshire. The machine was intended to demonstrate the capacity of projectile fusion to reach net energy gain. In February 2025, the firm announced that it no longer planned to develop Machine 4.

In March 2024, the firm announced that it had set a record of 1.85 terapascals with an 80-terawatt shot on the Z Pulsed Power Facility (Z Machine) at Sandia National Laboratories using its pressure amplifying technology.

In February 2025, the firm announced the appointment of Mark Thomas, former chief executive of Reaction Engines, as its chief executive, replacing Nicholas Hawker.

The firm published an updated strategy in March 2025. This strategic update established a new focus on generating revenue by commercialising the firm's proprietary amplifier technology and aiming for customers both in and out of the inertial fusion industry.

In the same month, the firm set a new pressure record on Sandia’s Z Machine using its pressure amplifier technology. In its second experiment on the Z Machine, First Light recorded an output pressure of 3.67 terapascals, doubling the pressure reached in the March 2024 first experiment on the machine.

In September 2025, the firm launched FLARE, their new approach to economically viable inertial fusion energy.

== Approach ==
FLARE (Fusion via Low-power Assembly and Rapid Excitation) is a proposed approach to inertial fusion energy under development by the firm. The method aims to transfer much of the performance requirements from the driver system to the fusion target. Instead of employing large and costly laser arrays, the system uses modular low-voltage pulsed power devices to deliver electric currents into hollow metal cylinders, known as imploding liners. These liners implode under magnetic pressure, compressing the fusion fuel (deuterium–tritium) within to high density. The process of ignition is then achieved separately, either by a short-pulse laser or an added pulsed power stage.

== See also ==
- List of nuclear fusion companies
