= Aneutronic fusion =

Form of fusion power

Lithium-6–deuterium fusion reaction: an aneutronic fusion reaction, with energy released carried by alpha particles, not neutrons.

Aneutronic fusion is any form of fusion power in which very little of the energy released is carried by neutrons. While the lowest-threshold nuclear fusion reactions release up to 80% of their energy as the kinetic energy of neutrons, aneutronic reactions release energy as the kinetic energy of charged particles, typically protons or alpha particles. Successful aneutronic fusion would greatly reduce problems associated with neutron radiation such as damaging ionizing radiation, neutron activation, reactor maintenance, and requirements for biological shielding, remote handling and safety.

Since it is simpler to convert the energy of charged particles into electrical power than it is to convert energy from uncharged particles, an aneutronic reaction would be attractive for power systems. Some proponents see a potential for dramatic cost reductions by converting energy directly to electricity, as well as in eliminating the radiation from neutrons, which are difficult to shield against. However, the conditions required to harness aneutronic fusion are much more extreme than those required for deuterium–tritium (D–T) fusion such as at ITER.

== History ==
The first experiments in the field started in 1939, and serious efforts have been continual since the early 1950s.

An early supporter was Richard F. Post at Lawrence Livermore. He proposed to capture the kinetic energy of charged particles as they were exhausted from a fusion reactor and convert this into voltage to drive current. Post helped develop the theoretical underpinnings of direct conversion, later demonstrated by Barr and Moir. They demonstrated a 48 percent energy capture efficiency on the Tandem Mirror Experiment in 1981.

Polywell fusion was pioneered by the late Robert W. Bussard in 1995 and funded by the US Navy. Polywell uses inertial electrostatic confinement. He founded EMC2 to continue polywell research.

A picosecond pulse of a 10-terawatt laser produced hydrogen–boron aneutronic fusions for a Russian team in 2005. However, the number of the resulting α particles (around 10^{3} per laser pulse) was low.

In 2006, the Z-machine at Sandia National Laboratory, a z-pinch device, reached 2 billion kelvins and 300 keV.

In 2011, Lawrenceville Plasma Physics published initial results and outlined a theory and experimental program for aneutronic fusion with the dense plasma focus (DPF). The effort was initially funded by NASA's Jet Propulsion Laboratory. Support for other DPF aneutronic fusion investigations came from the Air Force Research Laboratory.

A French research team fused protons and boron-11 nuclei using a laser-accelerated proton beam and high-intensity laser pulse. In October 2013 they reported an estimated 80 million fusion reactions during a 1.5 nanosecond laser pulse.

In 2021, TAE Technologies field-reversed configuration announced that its Norman device was regularly producing a stable plasma at temperatures over 50 million degrees.

In 2021, a Russian team reported experimental results in a miniature device with electrodynamic (oscillatory) plasma confinement. It used a ~1–2 J nanosecond vacuum discharge with a virtual cathode. Its field accelerates boron ions and protons to ~ 100–300 keV under oscillating ions' collisions. α-particles of about 5×10^{4}/4π (~ 10 α-particles/ns) were obtained during the 4 μs of applied voltage.

Australian spin-off company HB11 Energy was created in September 2019. In 2022, they claimed to be the first commercial company to demonstrate fusion.

== Definition ==
Fusion reactions can be categorized according to their neutronicity: the fraction of the fusion energy released as energetic neutrons. The State of New Jersey defined an aneutronic reaction as one in which neutrons carry no more than 1% of the total released energy, although many papers on the subject include reactions that do not meet this criterion.

== Coulomb barrier ==
The Coulomb barrier is the minimum energy required for the nuclei in a fusion reaction to overcome their mutual electrostatic repulsion. Once reactants are close enough, they become strongly attracted by the nuclear force, which dominates over the electrostatic repulsion.

Repulsive force between a particle with charge Z_{1} and one with Z_{2} is proportional to (Z_{1} × Z_{2}) / r^{2}, where r is the distance between them. The Coulomb barrier facing a pair of reacting, charged particles depends both on total charge and on how equally those charges are distributed; the barrier is lowest when a low-Z particle reacts with a high-Z one and highest when the reactants are of roughly equal charge. Barrier energy is thus minimized for those ions with the fewest protons.

When the two nuclei approach to within ~2 femtometres (~3 proton radii), the attractive strong nuclear interaction between their nucleons becomes appreciable. At that range, the nuclear attraction can dominate the remaining Coulomb repulsion and drive the system toward fusion. When the fused system has lower mass, the difference is released as nuclear energy $(m_{before} - m_{after})c^2$, carried off by the kinetic energy of resultant fragments.

More nucleons can give more nuclear binding, because there are more protons and neutrons for the strong force to bind. But protons also repel other protons, so adding protons also adds electrical repulsion. The neutron/proton ratio matters because nuclei with the wrong ratio are unstable.

In most fusion concepts, the energy needed to overcome the Coulomb barrier is provided by collisions with other fuel ions. In a thermalized fluid like a plasma, the temperature corresponds to an energy spectrum according to the Maxwell–Boltzmann distribution. Gases in this state have some particles with high energy even if the average energy is much lower. Fusion devices rely on this distribution; even at bulk temperatures far below the Coulomb barrier energy, the energy released by the reactions is great enough that capturing some of that can supply sufficient high-energy ions to keep the reaction going.

Thus, steady operation of the reactor is based on a balance between the rate that energy is added to the fuel by fusion reactions and the rate energy is lost to the surroundings. This concept is best expressed as the fusion triple product, the product of the temperature, density and "confinement time", the amount of time energy remains in the fuel before escaping to the environment. The product of temperature and density gives the reaction rate for any given fuel. The rate of reaction is proportional to the nuclear cross section (σ).

Any given device can sustain some maximum plasma pressure. An efficient device would continuously operate near this maximum. Given this pressure, the largest fusion output is obtained when the temperature is such that σv/T^{2} is a maximum. This is also the temperature at which the value of the triple product nTτ required for ignition is a minimum, since that required value is inversely proportional to σv/T^{2}. A plasma is "ignited" if the fusion reactions produce enough power to maintain the temperature without external heating.

Because the Coulomb barrier is proportional to the product of proton counts (Z_{1} × Z_{2}) of the two reactants, varieties of heavy hydrogen, deuterium and tritium (D–T), give the fuel with the lowest total Coulomb barrier. All other potential fuels have higher Coulomb barriers, and thus require higher operational temperatures. Additionally, D–T fuels have the highest nuclear cross-sections, which means the reaction rates are higher than any other fuel. This makes D–T fusion the easiest to achieve.

Comparing the potential of other fuels to the D–T reaction: The table below shows the ignition temperature and cross-section for three of the candidate aneutronic reactions, compared to D–T:

Candidate reactions
Reaction	Ignition T [keV]	Cross-section σv/T^{2} [m^{3}/s/keV^{2}]
^{2}_{1}D–^{3}_{1}T	13.6	1.24×10^{−24}
^{2}_{1}D–^{3}_{2}He	58	2.24×10^{−26}
p^{+}–^{6}_{3}Li	66	1.46×10^{−27}
p^{+}–^{11}_{5}B	123	3.01×10^{−27}

To estimate the temperature in Kelvin, multiply the temperature in keV by ten million. The easiest to ignite of the aneutronic reactions, D–^{3}He, has an ignition temperature over four times as high as that of the D–T reaction, and correspondingly lower cross-sections, while the p–^{11}B reaction is nearly ten times more difficult to ignite.

== Candidate reactions ==
Several fusion reactions produce no neutrons on any of their branches. Those with the largest cross sections are:

Isotopes	Reaction
^{2}_{1}D–^{3}_{2}He	^{2}D	+	^{3}He	→		^{4}He	+	^{1}p	+ 18.3 MeV
^{2}_{1}D–^{6}_{3}Li	^{2}D	+	^{6}Li	→	2	^{4}He			+ 22.4 MeV
p–^{6}_{3}Li	^{1}p	+	^{6}Li	→		^{4}He	+	^{3}He	+ 4.0 MeV
^{3}_{2}He–^{6}_{3}Li	^{3}He	+	^{6}Li	→	2	^{4}He	+	^{1}p	+ 16.9 MeV
^{3}_{2}He–^{3}_{2}He	^{3}He	+	^{3}He	→		^{4}He	+	2 ^{1}p	+ 12.86 MeV
p–^{7}_{3}Li	^{1}p	+	^{7}Li	→	2	^{4}He			+ 17.2 MeV
p–^{11}_{5}B	^{1}p	+	^{11}B	→	3	^{4}He			+ 8.7 MeV
p–^{15}_{7}N	^{1}p	+	^{15}N	→		^{12}C	+	^{4}He	+ 5.0 MeV

== Candidate fuels ==
=== ^{3}He ===
Helium-3 has been investigated as a candidate fuel for aneutronic fusion because several reactions involving ^{3}He predominantly produce charged particles rather than neutrons, potentially reducing neutron-induced material damage and radioactive activation compared with deuterium–tritium fusion (D-T).

A theoretically fully aneutronic, third-generation reaction is ^{3}He–^{3}He fusion:

³₂He + ³₂He → ⁴₂He + 2¹₁p + 12.86 MeV.

While this reaction produces only charged particles, it requires extremely high plasma temperatures and confinement and has not been demonstrated under reactor-relevant conditions, limiting its practical applicability to aneutronic fusion concepts.

Aneutronic fusion research involving ^{3}He has therefore focused primarily on the deuterium–helium-3 (D–³He) reaction,

D + ³He → ⁴He + p + 18.3 MeV,

which yields a helium-4 nucleus and a proton - charged particles that could, in principle, be confined and converted directly into electricity, offering a pathway to reduced neutron shielding requirements and simplified energy conversion. However, D–³He fusion requires substantially higher plasma temperatures and improved confinement compared with D–T, making it more challenging to achieve experimentally. In addition, unavoidable side reactions such as deuterium–deuterium fusion (D–D) inevitably occur in realistic plasmas, producing neutrons and introducing a small but non‑zero neutron flux; while this neutron production is significantly lower than in D–T fusion, it limits the extent to which D–³He systems can be considered strictly aneutronic.

As of the mid-2020s, no aneutronic fusion system has demonstrated sustained or net-energy operation using ^{3}He -based fuel cycles. In 2022, Helion Energy stated that its seventh-generation prototype, Polaris, was intended to demonstrate net electricity generation from fusion and to demonstrate ^{3}He production via D–D fusion within a high-efficiency closed fuel-cycle design. These statements represent development goals; as of 2025, net electricity production from Polaris has not been publicly demonstrated.

The limited Earth availability of ^{3}He remains a significant constraint for aneutronic fusion concepts based on ^{3}He. While off-Earth sources have been proposed, their relevance to practical aneutronic fusion depends on future advances in reactor performance and remains speculative.

=== Deuterium ===
Although the deuterium reactions (deuterium + ^{3}He and deuterium + ^{6}Li) do not in themselves release neutrons, in a fusion reactor the plasma would also produce D–D side reactions that result in reaction product of ^{3}He plus a neutron. Although neutron production can be minimized by running a plasma reaction hot and deuterium-lean, the fraction of energy released as neutrons is probably several percent, so that these fuel cycles, although neutron-poor, do not meet the 1% threshold. See ^{3}He. The D–^{3}He reaction also suffers from the ^{3}He fuel availability problem, as discussed above.

=== Lithium ===
Fusion reactions involving lithium are well studied due to the use of lithium for breeding tritium in thermonuclear weapons. They are intermediate in ignition difficulty between the reactions involving lower atomic-number species, H and He, and the ^{11}B reaction.

The p–^{7}Li reaction, although highly energetic, releases neutrons because of the high cross section for the alternate neutron-producing reaction ^{1}p + ^{7}Li → ^{7}Be + n

=== Boron ===
Many studies of aneutronic fusion concentrate on the p–^{11}B reaction, which uses easily available fuel. The fusion of the boron nucleus with a proton produces energetic alpha particles (helium nuclei).

Since igniting the p–^{11}B reaction is much more difficult than D–T, alternatives to the usual tokamak fusion reactors are usually proposed, such as inertial confinement fusion. One proposed method uses one laser to create a boron-11 plasma and another to create a stream of protons that smash into the plasma. The proton beam produces a tenfold increase of fusion because protons and boron nuclei collide directly. Earlier methods used a solid boron target, "protected" by its electrons, which reduced the fusion rate. Experiments suggest that a petawatt-scale laser pulse could launch an 'avalanche' fusion reaction, although this remains controversial. The plasma lasts about one nanosecond, requiring the picosecond pulse of protons to be precisely synchronized. Unlike conventional methods, this approach does not require a magnetically confined plasma. The proton beam is preceded by an electron beam, generated by the same laser, that strips electrons in the boron plasma, increasing the protons' chance to collide with the boron nuclei and fuse.

==== Residual radiation ====
Calculations show that at least 0.1% of the reactions in a thermal p–^{11}B plasma produce neutrons, although their energy accounts for less than 0.2% of the total energy released.

These neutrons come primarily from the reaction:

^{11}B + α → ^{14}N + n + 157 keV

The reaction itself produces only 157 keV, but the neutron carries a large fraction of the alpha energy, close to E_{fusion}/3 = 2.9 MeV. Another significant source of neutrons is:

^{11}B + p → ^{11}C + n - 2.8 MeV.

These neutrons are less energetic, with an energy comparable to the fuel temperature. In addition, ^{11}C itself is radioactive, but quickly decays to ^{11}B with a half life of only 20 minutes.

Since these reactions involve the reactants and products of the primary reaction, it is difficult to lower the neutron production by a significant fraction. A clever magnetic confinement scheme could in principle suppress the first reaction by extracting the alphas as they are created, but then their energy would not be available to keep the plasma hot. The second reaction could in principle be suppressed relative to the desired fusion by removing the high energy tail of the ion distribution, but this would probably be prohibited by the power required to prevent the distribution from thermalizing.

In addition to neutrons, large quantities of hard X-rays are produced by bremsstrahlung, and 4, 12, and 16 MeV gamma rays are produced by the fusion reaction

^{11}B + p → ^{12}C + γ + 16.0 MeV

with a branching probability relative to the primary fusion reaction of about 10^{−4}. (Note: As with the neutron dose, shielding is essential with this level of gamma radiation. The neutron calculation in the previous note would apply if the production rate is decreased a factor of ten and the quality factor is reduced from 20 to 1. Without shielding, the occupational dose from a small (30 kW) reactor would still be reached in about an hour.)

The hydrogen must be isotopically pure and the influx of impurities into the plasma must be controlled to prevent neutron-producing side reactions such as:

^{11}B + d → ^{12}C + n + 13.7 MeV
d + d → ^{3}He + n + 3.27 MeV

The shielding design reduces the occupational dose of both neutron and gamma radiation to a negligible level. The primary components are water (to moderate the fast neutrons), boron (to absorb the moderated neutrons) and metal (to absorb X-rays). The total thickness is estimated to be about one meter, mostly water.

== Laser technology ==
Laser power has been increasing at about 10^{3}x/decade amid falling costs. Advancements include:

- Diode-Pumped Solid-State Lasers (DPSSLs) convert more electrical input into light, reducing waste heat.
- Optical Parametric Chirped Pulse Amplification (OPCPA): These systems uses nonlinear optical processes to reduce thermal load and increase efficiency.
- Plasma-Based Pulse Compression: Plasma can be used to compress laser pulses, achieving high peak power with minimal energy loss.
- Coherent beam combining (CBC) merges multiple beams into a single, more powerful one, spreading thermal load from across multiple beams while coherently combining their energy.
- Efficient gas-cooled or cryogenic cooling systems are essential for operating high-power lasers.
- Gain media such as ytterbium-doped crystals or ceramics, offer better thermal properties and higher energy storage capabilities.
- Researchers prototyped a single-chip titanium:sapphire laser that is 10^{4}x smaller and 10^{3}x less expensive than earlier models.

== Energy capture ==
Aneutronic fusion produces energy in the form of charged particles instead of neutrons. This means that energy from aneutronic fusion could be captured directly instead of blasting neutrons at a target to boil something. Direct conversion can be either inductive, based on changes in magnetic fields, electrostatic, based on pitting charged particles against an electric field, or photoelectric, in which light energy is captured in a pulsed mode.

Electrostatic conversion uses the motion of charged particles to create voltage that produces current–electrical power. It is the reverse of phenomena that use a voltage to put a particle in motion. It has been described as a linear accelerator running backwards.

Aneutronic fusion loses much of its energy as light. This energy results from the acceleration and deceleration of charged particles. These speed changes can be caused by bremsstrahlung radiation, cyclotron radiation, synchrotron radiation, or electric field interactions. The radiation can be estimated using the Larmor formula and comes in the X-ray, UV, visible, and IR spectra. Some of the energy radiated as X-rays may be converted directly to electricity. Because of the photoelectric effect, X-rays passing through an array of conducting foils transfer some of their energy to electrons, which can then be captured electrostatically. Since X-rays can go through far greater material thickness than electrons, hundreds or thousands of layers are needed to absorb them.

== Technical challenges ==
Many challenges confront the commercialization of aneutronic fusion.

=== Temperature ===
The large majority of fusion research has gone toward D–T fusion, which is the easiest to achieve. Fusion experiments typically use deuterium–deuterium fusion (D–D) because deuterium is cheap and easy to handle, being non-radioactive. Experimenting with D–T fusion is more difficult because tritium is expensive and radioactive, requiring additional environmental protection and safety measures.

The combination of lower cross-section and higher loss rates in D–^{3}He fusion is offset to a degree because the reactants are mainly charged particles that deposit their energy in the plasma. This combination of offsetting features demands an operating temperature about four times that of a D–T system. However, due to the high loss rates and consequent rapid cycling of energy, the confinement time of a working reactor needs to be about fifty times higher than D–T, and the energy density about 80 times higher. This requires significant advances in plasma physics.

Proton–boron fusion requires ion energies, and thus plasma temperatures, some nine times higher than those for D–T fusion. For any given density of the reacting nuclei, the reaction rate for proton-boron achieves its peak rate at around 600 keV (6.6 billion degrees Celsius or 6.6 gigakelvins) while D–T has a peak at around 66 keV (765 million degrees Celsius, or 0.765 gigakelvin). For pressure-limited confinement concepts, optimum operating temperatures are about 5 times lower, but the ratio is still roughly ten-to-one.

=== Power balance ===
The peak reaction rate of p–^{11}B is only one third that for D–T, requiring better plasma confinement. Confinement is usually characterized by the time τ the energy is retained so that the power released exceeds that required to heat the plasma. Various requirements can be derived, most commonly the Lawson criterion, the product of the density, nτ, and the product with the pressure nTτ. The nτ required for p–^{11}B is 45 times higher than that for D–T. The nTτ required is 500 times higher. (Note: Both figures assume the electrons have the same temperature as the ions. If operation with cold electrons is possible, as discussed below, the relative disadvantage of p–^{11}B would be a factor of three smaller, as calculated here.) Since the confinement properties of conventional fusion approaches, such as the tokamak and laser pellet fusion are marginal, most aneutronic proposals use radically different confinement concepts.

In most fusion plasmas, bremsstrahlung radiation is a major energy loss channel. (See also bremsstrahlung losses in quasineutral, isotropic plasmas.) For the p–^{11}B reaction, some calculations indicate that the bremsstrahlung power will be at least 1.74 times larger than the fusion power. The corresponding ratio for the ^{3}He–^{3}He reaction is only slightly more favorable at 1.39. This is not applicable to non-neutral plasmas, and different in anisotropic plasmas.

In conventional reactor designs, whether based on magnetic or inertial confinement, the bremsstrahlung can easily escape the plasma and is considered a pure energy loss term. The outlook would be more favorable if the plasma could reabsorb the radiation. Absorption occurs primarily via Thomson scattering on the electrons, which has a total cross section of σ_{T} = 6.65×10^{−29} m^{2}. In a 50–50 D–T mixture this corresponds to a range of 6.3 g/cm^{2}. This is considerably higher than the Lawson criterion of ρR > 1 g/cm^{2}, which is already difficult to attain, but might be achievable in inertial confinement systems.

In megatesla magnetic fields a quantum mechanical effect might suppress energy transfer from the ions to the electrons. According to one calculation, bremsstrahlung losses could be reduced to half the fusion power or less. In a strong magnetic field cyclotron radiation is even larger than the bremsstrahlung. In a megatesla field, an electron would lose its energy to cyclotron radiation in a few picoseconds if the radiation could escape. However, in a sufficiently dense plasma (n_{e} > 2.5×10^{30} m^{−3}, a density greater than that of a solid), the cyclotron frequency is less than twice the plasma frequency. In this well-known case, the cyclotron radiation is trapped inside the plasmoid and cannot escape, except from a very thin surface layer.

While megatesla fields have not yet been achieved, fields of 0.3 megatesla have been produced with high intensity lasers, and fields of 0.02–0.04 megatesla have been observed with the dense plasma focus device.

At much higher densities (n_{e} > 6.7×10^{34} m^{−3}), the electrons will be Fermi degenerate, which suppresses bremsstrahlung losses, both directly and by reducing energy transfer from the ions to the electrons. If necessary conditions can be attained, net energy production from p–^{11}B or D–^{3}He fuel may be possible. The probability of a feasible reactor based solely on this effect remains low, however, because the gain is predicted to be less than 20, while more than 200 is usually considered to be necessary.

=== Power density ===
In every published fusion power plant design, the part of the plant that produces the fusion reactions is much more expensive than the part that converts the nuclear power to electricity. In that case, as indeed in most power systems, power density is an important characteristic. (Note: Comparing two different types of power systems involves many factors in addition to the power density. Two of the most important are the volume in which energy is produced in comparison to the total volume of the device, and the cost and complexity of the device. In contrast, the comparison of two different fuel cycles in the same type of machine is generally much more robust.) Doubling power density at least halves the cost of electricity. In addition, the confinement time required depends on the power density.

It is, however, not trivial to compare the power density produced by different fusion fuel cycles. The case most favorable to p–^{11}B relative to D–T fuel is a (hypothetical) confinement device that only works well at ion temperatures above about 400 keV, in which the reaction rate parameter σv is equal for the two fuels, and that runs with low electron temperature. p–^{11}B does not require as long a confinement time because the energy of its charged products is two and a half times higher than that for D–T. However, relaxing these assumptions, for example by considering hot electrons, by allowing the D–T reaction to run at a lower temperature or by including the energy of the neutrons in the calculation shifts the power density advantage to D–T.

The most common assumption is to compare power densities at the same pressure, choosing the ion temperature for each reaction to maximize power density, and with the electron temperature equal to the ion temperature. Although confinement schemes can be and sometimes are limited by other factors, most well-investigated schemes have some kind of pressure limit. Under these assumptions, the power density for p–^{11}B is about 2100 times smaller than that for D–T. Using cold electrons lowers the ratio to about 700. These numbers are another indication that aneutronic fusion power is not possible with mainline confinement concepts.

== See also ==
- CNO cycle
- Cold fusion
- History of nuclear fusion
