= Magnetized target fusion =

Fusion power research concept

Magnetized target fusion (MTF) is a fusion power concept that combines features of magnetic confinement fusion (MCF) and inertial confinement fusion (ICF).

Like the magnetic approach, the fusion fuel is confined at lower density by magnetic fields while it is heated into a plasma. As with the inertial approach, fusion is initiated by rapidly squeezing the target to greatly increase fuel density and temperature. Although the resulting density is far lower than in ICF, it is thought that the combination of longer confinement times and better heat retention will let MTF operate, yet be easier to build.

The term magneto-inertial fusion (MIF) is similar, but encompasses a wider variety of arrangements. The two terms are often applied interchangeably to experiments.

== Fusion concepts ==
In fusion, lighter atoms are fused to make heavier atoms. The easiest fuels to do this with are isotopes of hydrogen. Generally these reactions take place inside a plasma. A plasma is a heated gas, where all the electrons have been stripped away; the gas has been fully ionized. The ions are positively charged, so they repel each other due to the electrostatic force. Fusion occurs when two ions collide at high energy, allowing the strong force to overcome the electrostatic repulsion at a short distance. The amount of energy that needs to be applied to force the nuclei together is named the Coulomb barrier or fusion barrier energy. For fusion to occur in bulk plasma, it must be heated to tens of millions of degrees and compressed at high pressures, for a sufficient amount of time. Together, this is termed the triple product (see Lawson criterion). Fusion research focuses on reaching the highest triple product possible.

Magnetic fusion works to heat a dilute plasma (10^{14} ions per cm^{3}) to high temperatures, around 20 keV (~200 million C). Ambient air is about 100,000 times denser. To make a practical reactor at these temperatures, the fuel must be confined for long periods of time, on the order of 1 second. The ITER tokamak design is currently being built to test the magnetic approach with pulse lengths up to 20 minutes.

Inertial fusion attempts to produce much higher densities, 10^{25} ions per cubic cm, about 100 times the density of lead. This causes the reactions to occur extremely quickly (~1 nanosecond). Confinement is not needed; although the heat and particles created by the reactions will cause the plasma to explode outward, the speed this occurs is slower than the fusion reactions.

As of 2018, both of these methods of nuclear fusion are nearing net energy (Q>1) levels after many decades of research, but remain far from practical energy-producing devices.

== Approach ==
While MCF and ICF attack the Lawson criterion problem from different directions, MTF attempts to work between the two. MTF aims for a plasma density of 10^{19} cm^{−3}, intermediate between MCF (10^{14} cm^{−3}) and ICF (10^{25} cm^{−3}) At this density, confinement times must be on the order of 1 μs, again intermediate between the other two. MTF uses magnetic fields to slow down plasma losses, and inertial compression is used to heat the plasma.

In general terms, MTF is an inertial method. Density is increased through a pulsed operation that compresses the fuel, heating the plasma, just as compression heats an ordinary gas. In traditional ICF, more energy is added through the lasers that compress the target, but that energy leaks away through multiple channels. MTF employs a magnetic field that is created before compression that confines and insulates fuel so less energy is lost. The result, compared to ICF, is a somewhat-dense, somewhat-hot fuel mass that undergoes fusion at a medium reaction rate, so it only must be confined for a medium length of time.

As the fuel pellet is compressed, the heat and pressure in the plasma grow. The rate of collapse is generally linear, but the pressure is based on the volume, which increases with the cube of the compression. At some point the pressure is enough to stop and then reverse the collapse. The mass of the metal liner around the fuel means this process takes some time to occur. The MTF concept is based on having this dwell time be long enough for the fusion processes to take place.

MTF has advantages over both ICF and low-density plasma fusion. Its energy inputs are relatively efficient and inexpensive, whereas ICF demands specialized high-performance lasers that currently offer low efficiency. The cost and complexity of these lasers, termed "drivers", is so great that traditional ICF methods remain impractical for commercial energy production. Likewise, although MTF needs magnetic confinement to stabilize and insulate the fuel while it is being compressed, the needed confinement time is thousands of times less than for MCF. Confinement times of the order needed for MTF were demonstrated in MCF experiments years ago.

The densities, temperatures and confinement times needed by MTF are well within the current state of the art and have been repeatedly demonstrated. Los Alamos National Laboratory has referred to the concept as a "low cost path to fusion".

== Devices ==
=== FRX-L ===
In the pioneering experiment, Los Alamos National Laboratory's FRX-L, a plasma is first created at low density by transformer-coupling an electric current through a gas inside a quartz tube (generally a non-fuel gas for testing purposes). This heats the plasma to about 200 eV (~2.3 million degrees). External magnets confine fuel within the tube. Plasmas are electrically conducting, allowing a current to pass through them. This current, generates a magnetic field that interacts with the current. The plasma is arranged so that the fields and current stabilize within the plasma once it is set up, self-confining the plasma. FRX-L uses the field-reversed configuration for this purpose. Since the temperature and confinement time is 100x lower than in MCF, the confinement is relatively easy to arrange and does not need the complex and expensive superconducting magnets used in most modern MCF experiments.

FRX-L is used solely for plasma creation, testing and diagnostics. It uses four high-voltage (up to 100 kV) capacitor banks storing up to 1 MJ of energy to drive a 1.5 MA current in one-turn magnetic-field coils that surround a 10 cm diameter quartz tube. In its current form as a plasma generator, FRX-L has demonstrated densities between (2 and 4)×10^{16} cm^{−3}, temperatures of 100 to 250 eV, magnetic fields of 2.5 T and lifetimes of 10 to 15 μs. All of these are within an order of magnitude of what would be needed for an energy-positive machine.

FRX-L was later upgraded to add an "injector" system. This is situated around the quartz tube and consists of a conical arrangement of magnetic coils. When powered, the coils generate a field that is strong at one end of the tube and weaker at the other, pushing the plasma out the larger end. To complete the system, the injector was planned to be placed above the focus of the existing Shiva Star "can crusher" at the Air Force Research Laboratory's Directed Energy Lab at the Kirtland Air Force Base in Albuquerque, New Mexico.

=== FRCHX ===
In 2007, an experiment called FRCHX was placed on Shiva Star. Similar to FRX-L, it uses a generation area and injects the plasma bundle into the Shiva Star liner compression area. Shiva Star delivers about 1.5 MJ into the kinetic energy of the 1 mm thick aluminum liner, which collapses cylindrically at about 5 km/s. This collapses the plasma bundle to a density around 5×10^{18} cm^{−3} and raises the temperature to about 5 keV, producing neutron yields on the order of 10^{12} neutrons "per shot" using a D-D fuel. The power released in the larger shots, in the range of MJ, needs a period of resetting the equipment on the order of a week. The huge electromagnetic pulse (EMP) caused by the equipment forms a challenging environment for diagnostics.

=== Fusion demonstration plant ===
General Fusion of Canada, in partnership with the UK's Atomic Energy Authority, is to build a demonstration plant at Culham, England, as a precursor to a commercially viable pilot plant. The reaction vessel will be a fast-rotating cylinder of liquid metal (lead, incorporating lithium to harvest the tritium formed through neutron activation) which is formed into a sphere by the action of synchronised pistons driven by steam. Magnetized fusion fuel as plasma is injected into the sphere as it contracts, producing sufficient temperature and pressure for the fusion reaction to take place. The liquid metal is circulated through heat exchangers to provide steam. Construction is expected to start in 2022, with operations beginning in 2025.

In December 2024, General Fusion completed the construction of its Lawson Machine 26 (LM26) MTF test reactor in Richmond, British Columbia.

== Challenges ==
MTF is not the first "new approach" to fusion power. When ICF was introduced in the 1960s, it was a radical new approach that aimed to produce practical fusion devices by the 1980s. Other approaches have encountered unexpected problems that greatly increased the difficulty of producing output power. With MCF, it was unexpected instabilities in plasmas as density or temperature was increased. With ICF, it was unexpected losses of energy and difficulties "smoothing" the beams. These have been partially addressed in large modern machines, but only at great expense.

In a general sense, MTF's challenges appear to be similar to those of ICF. To produce power effectively, the density must be increased to a working level and then held there long enough for most of the fuel mass to undergo fusion. This is occurring while the metal liner is being driven inwards. Mixing of the metal with the fusion fuel would "quench" the reaction (a problem that occurs in MCF systems when plasma touches the vessel wall). Similarly, the collapse must be fairly symmetrical to avoid "hot spots" that could destabilize the plasma while it burns.

Problems in commercial development are similar to those for any of the existing fusion reactor designs. The need to form high-strength magnetic fields at the focus of the machine is at odds with the need to extract the heat from the interior, making the physical arrangement of the reactor a challenge. Further, the fusion process emits large numbers of neutrons (in common reactions at least) that lead to neutron embrittlement that degrades the strength of the support structures and conductivity of metal wiring. In typical MCF schemes, neutrons are intended to be captured in a lithium shell to generate more tritium to feed in as fuel, further complicating the overall arrangement. Deuterium-deuterium fusion would avoid this requirement.

== Kopeck problem ==
Another concern for the MTF concept is named the kopeck problem. The kopeck is the Russian currency unit similar to the penny or cent, with 100 kopecks in rouble. The name alludes to a tiny value of money.

The problem is that the metal liners used in baseline MTF are consumed during the reaction. In return, the device would generate electricity. However, the value of that electricity is very low, on the order of a few pennies. Thus, in order to generate net positive cash flow, the device has to generate enormous amounts of energy per shot, unrealistically high amounts, or the cost of the fuel assemblies must be tiny, about a kopeck.

Two potential solutions to the kopeck problem have been identified. The use of "hotspot ignition" (also explored in traditional ICF) appears to allow a great increase in energy release compared to energy input, thus addressing the problem from the gain side. The other solution is to attempt to recycle some of the components, or in the case of fluid-wall systems, not lose any material in the first place.

== See also ==
- Helion Energy, a company working on magneto-inertial fusion
