= Z-pinch =

Plasma compressor and nuclear fusion system

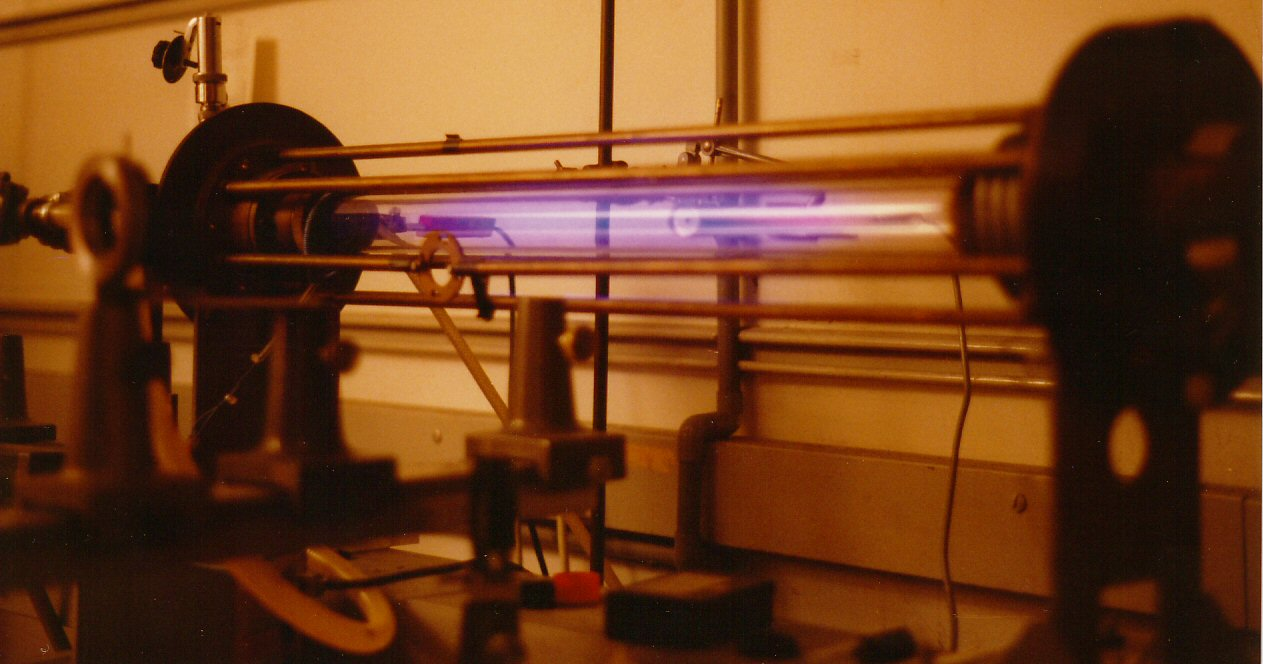
A laboratory-scale Z-pinch showing glow from an expanded hydrogen plasma. The pinch current flows through the gas and returns via the bars surrounding the plasma vessel.

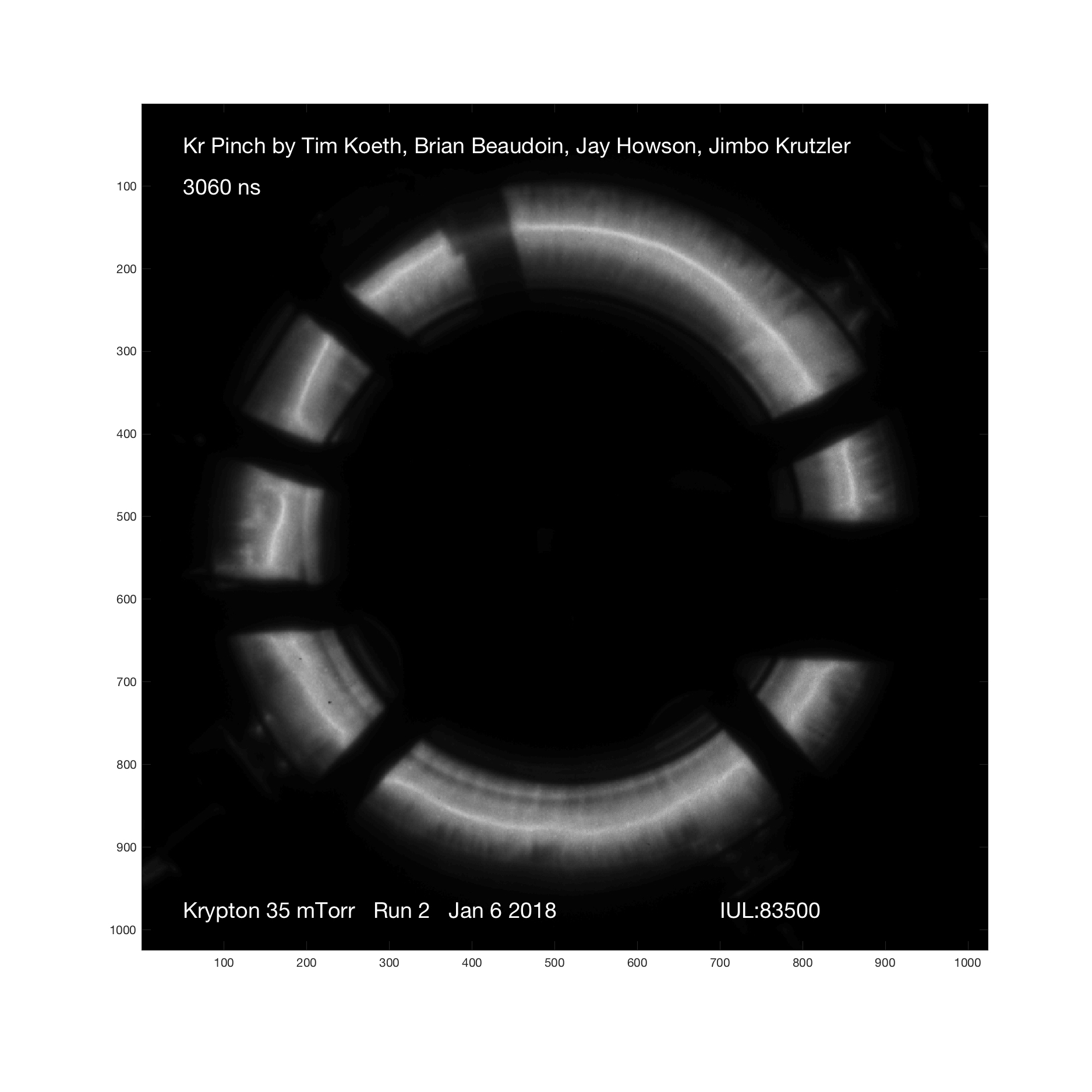
A desktop-sized inductively coupled current-driven toroidal Z-pinch in a krypton plasma showing an intense glow from a plasma filament.

In fusion power research, the Z-pinch (zeta pinch) is a type of plasma confinement system that uses an electric current in the plasma to generate a magnetic field that compresses it (see pinch). These systems were originally referred to simply as pinch or Bennett pinch (after Willard Harrison Bennett), but the introduction of the θ-pinch (theta pinch) concept led to the need for clearer, more precise terminology.

The name refers to the direction of the current in the devices, the Z-axis on a Cartesian three-dimensional graph. Any machine that causes a pinch effect due to current running in that direction is correctly referred to as a Z-pinch system, and this encompasses a wide variety of devices used for an equally wide variety of purposes. Early uses focused on fusion research in donut-shaped tubes with the Z-axis running down the inside of the tube, while modern devices are generally cylindrical and used to generate high-intensity x-ray sources for the study of nuclear weapons and other roles. It is one of the first approaches to fusion power devices, along with the stellarator and magnetic mirror.

== Physics ==
The Z-pinch is an application of the Lorentz force, in which a current-carrying conductor in a magnetic field experiences a force. One example of the Lorentz force is that, if two parallel wires are carrying current in the same direction, the wires will be pulled toward each other. In a Z-pinch machine the wires are replaced by a plasma, which can be thought of as many current-carrying wires. When a current is run through the plasma, the particles in the plasma are pulled toward each other by the Lorentz force, thus the plasma contracts. The contraction is counteracted by the increasing gas pressure of the plasma.

As the plasma is electrically conductive, a magnetic field nearby will induce a current in it. This provides a way to run a current into the plasma without physical contact, which is important as a plasma can rapidly erode mechanical electrodes. In practical devices this was normally arranged by placing the plasma vessel inside the core of a transformer, arranged so the plasma itself would be the secondary. When current was sent into the primary side of the transformer, the magnetic field induced a current into the plasma. As induction requires a changing magnetic field, and the induced current is supposed to run in a single direction in most reactor designs, the current in the transformer has to be increased over time to produce the varying magnetic field. This places a limit on the product of confinement time and magnetic field, for any given source of power.

In Z-pinch machines the current is generally provided from a large bank of capacitors and triggered by a spark gap, known as a Marx Bank or Marx generator. As the conductivity of plasma is fairly good, about that of copper, the energy stored in the power source is quickly depleted by running through the plasma. Z-pinch devices are inherently pulsed in nature.

== History ==
=== Early machines ===
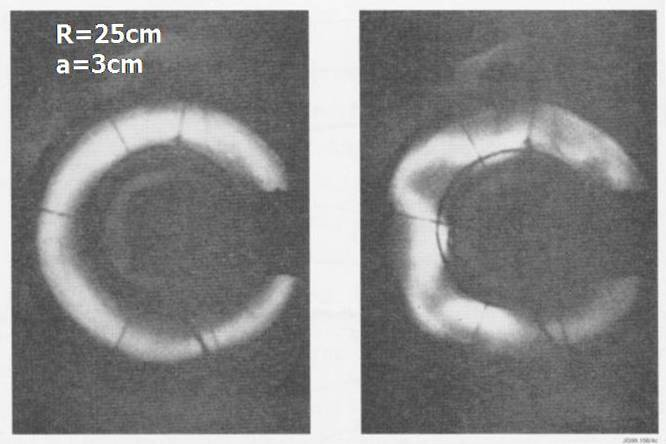
An early photograph of the kink instability in a toroidal pinch – the 3 by 25 pyrex tube at Aldermaston.

Pinch devices were among the earliest efforts in fusion power. Research began in the UK in the immediate post-war era, but a lack of interest led to little development until the 1950s. The announcement of the Huemul Project in early 1951 led to fusion efforts around the world, notably in the UK and in the US (see Perhapsatron, a z-pinch machine at LANL). Small experiments were built at labs as various practical issues were addressed, but all of these machines demonstrated unexpected instabilities of the plasma that would cause it to hit the walls of the container vessel. The problem became known as the "kink instability".

=== Stabilized pinch ===
By 1953 the "stabilized pinch" seemed to solve the problems encountered on earlier devices. Stabilized pinch machines added external magnets that created a toroidal magnetic field inside the chamber. When the device was fired, this field added to the one created by the current in the plasma. The result was that the formerly straight magnetic field was twisted into a helix, which the particles followed as they traveled around the tube driven by the current. A particle near the outside of the tube that wanted to kink outward would travel along these lines until it returned to the inside of the tube, where its outward-directed motion would bring it back into the centre of the plasma.

Researchers in the UK started construction of ZETA in 1954. ZETA was by far the largest fusion device of its era. At the time, almost all fusion research was classified, so progress on ZETA was generally unknown outside the labs working on it. However US researchers visited ZETA and realized that they were about to be outpaced. Teams on both sides of the Atlantic rushed to be the first to complete stabilized pinch machines.

ZETA won the race, and by the summer of 1957 it was producing bursts of neutrons on every run. Despite the researchers' reservations, their results were released with great fanfare as the first successful step on the path to commercial fusion energy. However, further study soon demonstrated that the measurements were misleading, and none of the machines were near fusion levels. Interest in pinch devices faded, although ZETA and its cousin Sceptre served for many years as experimental devices.

=== Fusion-based propulsion ===
A concept of Z-pinch fusion propulsion system was developed through collaboration between NASA and private companies. The energy released by the Z-pinch effect would accelerate lithium propellant to a high speed, resulting in a specific impulse value of 19400 s and thrust of 38 kN. A magnetic nozzle would be required to convert the released energy into a useful impulse. This propulsion method could potentially reduce interplanetary travel times. For example, a mission to Mars would take about 35 days one-way with a total burn time of 20 days and a burned propellant mass of 350 tonnes.

=== Tokamak ===
Although it remained relatively unknown for years, Soviet scientists used the pinch concept to develop the tokamak device. Unlike the stabilized pinch devices in the US and UK, the tokamak used considerably more energy in the stabilizing magnets, and much less in the plasma current. This reduced the instabilities due to the large currents in the plasma, and led to great improvements in stability. The results were so dramatic that other researchers were skeptical when they were first announced in 1968. Members of the still-operational ZETA team were called in to verify the results. The tokamak became the most studied approach to controlled fusion.

=== Sheared-flow stabilized ===
Sheared-flow stabilizing uses one or more high speed annular flowing plasma layers, surrounding a plasma filament, to stabilize the filament against kink and pinch instabilities.

In 2018, a sheared-flow stabilized Z-pinch demonstrated neutron generation. It was built by a fusion company, Zap Energy, Inc., a spin-off from the University of Washington, and funded by strategic and financial investors and grants from the Advanced Research Projects Agency – Energy (ARPA-E). Flow stabilized plasma remained stable 5,000 times longer than a static plasma. A mix of 20% deuterium and 80% hydrogen by pressure, produced neutron emissions lasting approximately 5 μs with pinch currents of approximately 200 kA during an approximately 16 μs period of plasma quiescence. Average neutron yield was estimated to be (1.25±0.45)×10^{5} neutrons/pulse. Plasma temperatures of 1–2 keV (12–24 million °C) and densities of approximately 10^{17} cm^{−3} with 0.3 cm pinch radii were measured.

=== Companies ===
As of 2026, at least two companies are pursuing magneto-inertial z-pinch fusion reactors, both fueled by deuterium–tritium reactions, and in the United States: Magneto Inertial Fusion Technology Inc. (MIFTI), founded in 2008, as a spin-off of the University of California, Irvine, and now a division of US Nuclear Corp, and Zap Energy, founded in 2017, as a spin-off of the University of Washington.

== Experiments ==
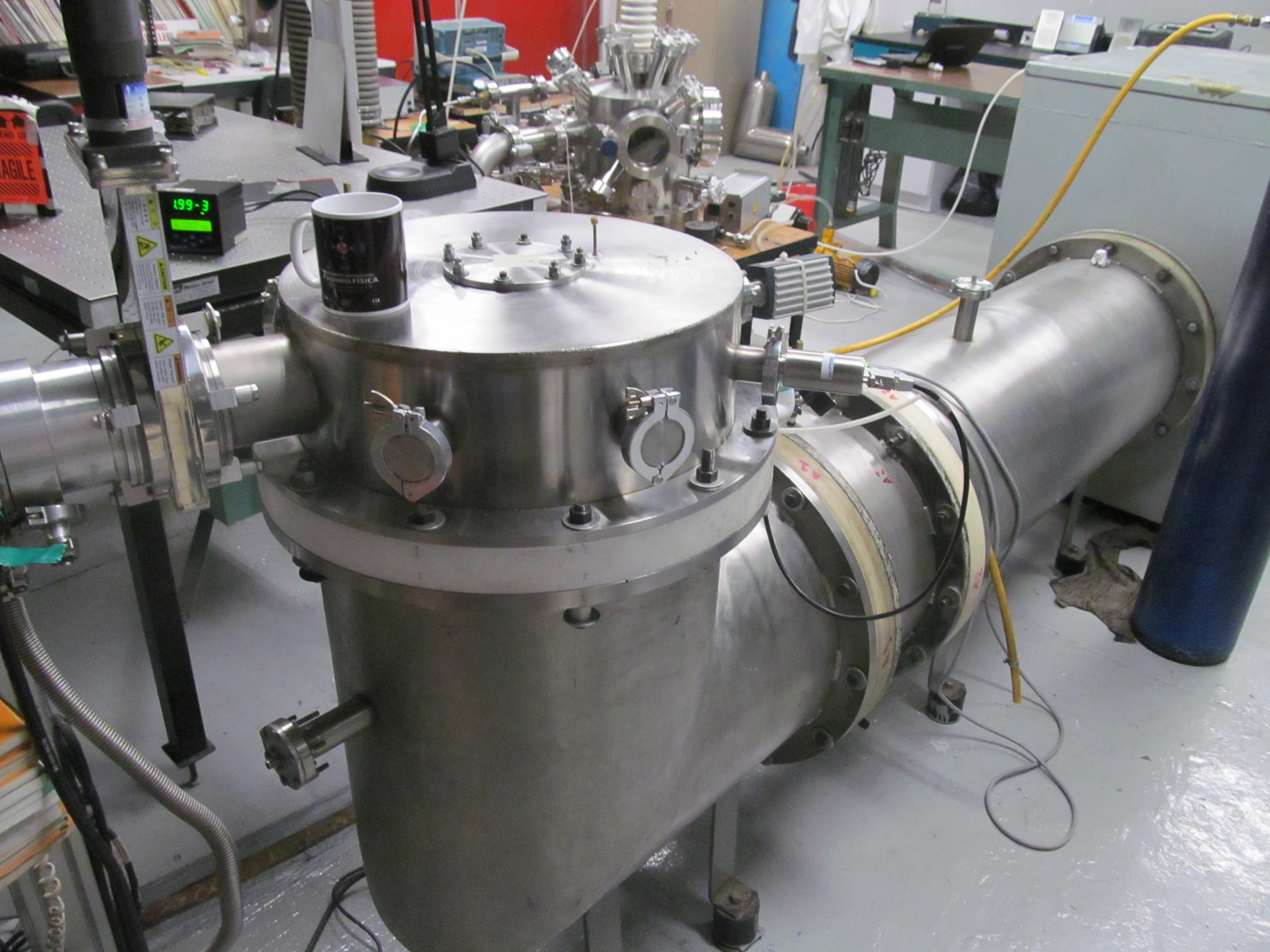
A Z-pinch machine at UAM, Mexico City.

The Z-pinch machines can be found at University of Nevada, Reno (USA), Cornell University (USA), University of Michigan (USA), Sandia National Laboratories (USA), University of California, San Diego (USA), University of Washington (USA), Ruhr University (Germany), Imperial College (United Kingdom), École Polytechnique (France), Weizmann Institute of Science (Israel), Universidad Autónoma Metropolitana (Mexico), GLAST (Pakistan).

== See also ==
- Z Pulsed Power Facility
- Pinch (plasma physics)
- List of nuclear fusion companies
