= Fusion Industry Association =

- Abbreviation: FIA
- Established: 2018; 8 years ago
- Type: trade association
- Location: Washington, D.C.
- Region served: world
- Members: 42 corporate, 100+ affiliate (2026)
- Official language: English
- CEO: Andrew Holland
- Website: www.fusionindustryassociation.org

The Fusion Industry Association (FIA) is a US-registered non-profit independent trade association for the international nuclear fusion industry. It is headquartered in Washington, D.C. It was founded in 2018 to advocate for policies to accelerate the arrival of fusion power. Its CEO is Andrew Holland, former chief operating officer of the American Security Project. The Fusion Industry Association has 42 fusion company members and over 100 affiliate members, including engineering firms, suppliers, utilities, law firms, cleantech organizations, academic institutions, and various professional services with business in the fusion industry. The emergence of the Fusion Industry Association can be traced back to the 2013 publication of a white paper on fusion energy by the American Security Project.

The Fusion Industry Association's objective is to support the global fusion industry by: building and supporting public-private partnership programs that allow for collaboration between industry and national labs & universities; ensuring regulatory certainty; and ensuring fusion is on a level playing field relative to other clean energy technologies. The FIA is seen as one of the main drivers behind the development of fusion pilot plants and supported the fusion energy public-private partnership amendment in H.R.133 - Consolidated Appropriations Act, 2021, which authorized $325 million over 5 years for the partnership program to build fusion demonstration facilities. The Fusion Industry Association has also played a role in the formation of the Congressional Fusion Caucus.

Challenges facing the Association include attracting funding needed to create a commercial fusion power industry; furthering the private sector's relationship with the public sector; internationalizing a Global North-dominated energy development sector by bridging the North–south divide, and the credibility of some of its members.

== See also ==
- Canadian Nuclear Association
- Nuclear Energy Institute
- Nuclear Industry Association
- World Nuclear Association
