= Magneto-inertial fusion =

Approach to controlled thermonuclear reactions combining the two main research paradigms

Magneto-inertial fusion (MIF) is a class of fusion power devices that combines aspects of magnetic confinement fusion and inertial confinement fusion in an attempt to lower the cost of fusion devices. MIF uses magnetic fields to confine an initial warm, low-density plasma, then compresses that plasma to fusion conditions using an impulsive driver or "liner." It is also known as magnetized target fusion (MTF) and magnitnoye obzhatiye (MAGO) in Russia.

Magneto-inertial fusion approaches differ in the degree of magnetic organization present in the initial target, as well as the nature and speed of the imploding liner. Laser, solid, liquid and plasma liners have all been proposed.

Magneto-inertial fusion begins with a warm dense plasma target containing a magnetic field. Plasma's conductivity prevents it from crossing magnetic field lines. Compressing the target amplifies the magnetic field. Since the magnetic field reduces particle transport, the field insulates the target from the liner.

== History ==
The MIF concept traces its history to comments by Andrei Sakharov in the 1950s, who noted that a magnetic field in a foil could be compressed and could, in theory, reach millions of Gauss. The concept was not picked up until the 1960s, when Evgeny Velikhov at the Kurchatov Institute began small-scale experiments using metal foils that were imploded by an external magnetic field. It was realized that the cost of the metal liners would likely be higher than the value of the electricity they would produce, the "kopeck problem", (Note: Named for the Soviet equivalent of a penny, the kopeck.) and they considered the idea of using a reusable liquid metal liner instead.

At a 1971 meeting of fusion researchers, Ramy Shanny of the United States Naval Research Laboratory (NRL) talked to Velikhov about his ideas. Shanny asked about how such a system would be stabilized against Rayleigh–Taylor instability during the collapse. Velikhov misunderstood the question, thinking he was asking how it would be stabilized against gravity within the drum. He replied that they would spin it. Shanny, believing Velikhov was saying spinning would address Rayleigh-Taylor problems, performed the calculations and found that it did indeed stabilize these instabilities.

On his return to the NRL, Shanny began a liquid liner program known as Linus. The idea was to spin a cylinder filled with a liquid metal rapidly enough that the metal would be forced to the outside of the cylinder and leave an opening in the center where plasma would be injected. Additional metal would then be forced into cylinder the using pistons or similar means, causing the opening in the center to close and the plasma to rapidly collapse.

The Linus program was successful to a point, but as the scale of the compression ramped up the system began to face the problem that the collapsing metal would squeeze the plasma out of the ends of the cylinder more rapidly than expected, too rapidly to complete the compression. Looking for solutions to this problem, they began to adapt the recently discovered field-reversed configuration (FRC), which causes the plasma to form into a self-stable form. By injecting the plasma in FRC, it would not squirt out the ends. Interest in mechanical compression waned as the researchers turned to studying FRCs.

== In popular fiction ==
The starships in Mike Kupari's novel Her Brother's Keeper are propelled in part by magneto-inertial fusion rockets.

== See also ==
- Inertial confinement fusion (ICF)
- Magnetized Liner Inertial Fusion
- Magnetized target fusion
- Helion Energy
- General Fusion
