= Tandem Mirror Experiment =

Experimental fusion reactor

TMX & TMX-U
Tandem Mirror Experiment
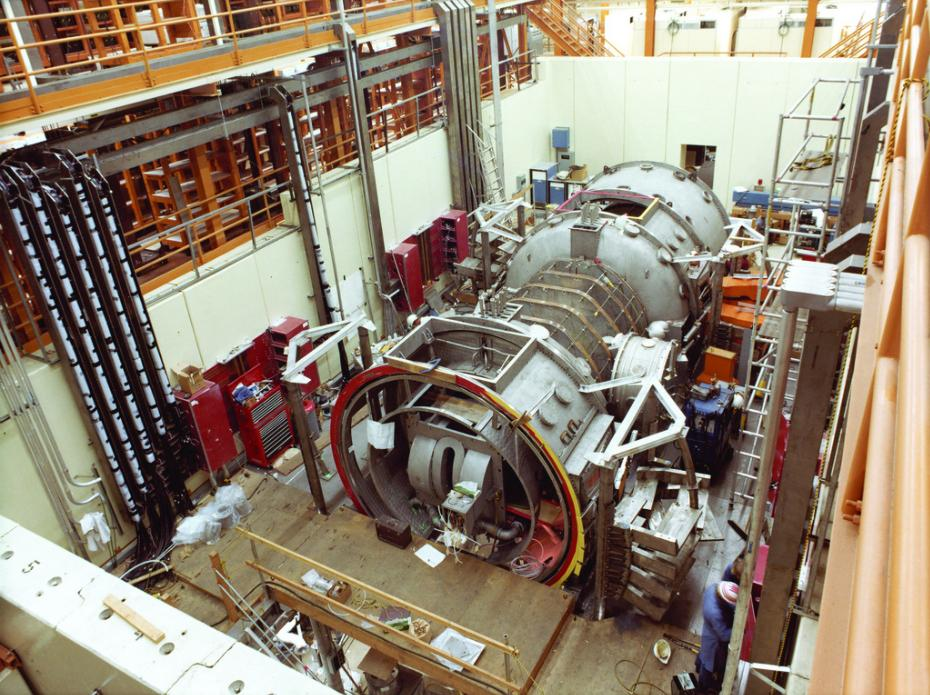
- The Tandem Mirror Experiment (TMX) in 1979
- Device type: Magnetic mirror
- Location: Livermore, California, U.S.
- Affiliation: Lawrence Livermore National Laboratory

History
- Date(s) of construction: 1977 – 1979
- Year(s) of operation: 1979–1987
- Preceded by: 2XIIB
- Related devices: Mirror Fusion Test Facility (MFTF)

The Tandem Mirror Experiment (TMX and TMX-U) was a magnetic mirror machine operated from 1979 to 1987 at the Lawrence Livermore National Laboratory. It was the first large-scale machine to test the "tandem mirror" concept in which two mirrors trapped a large volume of plasma between them in an effort to increase the efficiency of the reactor.

The original TMX was designed and built in a short period between its conception at a major physics meeting in Germany in October 1976, its design in January 1977, and its completion in October 1978. Over the next year, it validated the tandem mirror approach. Plans began to build a much larger machine based on the same principles, the Mirror Fusion Test Facility (MFTF). MFTF was initially just a scaled-up version of TMX, but when the design was studied it was seen that it would not reach its desired performance. Some system was needed that would boost the internal temperature of the fuel.

A solution was found in the form of "thermal barriers" which would trap high-energy electrons and allow the fuel to be increased in energy without increasing leakage. MFTF was modified to add barriers and became MFTF-B. While construction on MFTF-B began, thermal barriers were added to TMX to become TMX-U in 1982. While TMX-U validated the concept in general, the thermal barriers were not stable. MFTF-B was almost complete by this time, and funding was cancelled the day after its completion. TMX-U continued to operate until February 1987.

== History ==
=== Early mirrors and instability ===
Magnetic mirror machines were among the first serious designs for fusion reactors, along with the stellarator and z-pinch. The machine was very simple, consisting largely of a solenoid in which the wires were not wound evenly but had areas at each end with more windings. When a current ran through the windings, the resulting magnetic field would pinch down at the ends, causing the electrons and ions to reflect back into the center and thereby stay confined. Richard F. Post at the Lawrence Livermore National Laboratory (LLNL) became a major proponent of the concept, and Livermore became a worldwide center for mirror research.

In a famous talk in 1954, Edward Teller expressed his belief that machines like the mirror had an inherent instability, today known as the interchange instability, which would make them incapable of trapping a plasma for anywhere near the required time scales. At the time, in the infancy of the program, none of the existing machines could confine a plasma long enough to see whether this was true. By 1960, Livermore had built several ever-larger mirror machines with longer confinement times, and no hint of the problem could be found.

The mystery was solved at an international meeting in 1961 when Lev Artsimovich asked if the Livermore teams had calibrated a particular measurement instrument to account for a delay in its readings. They had not; it was immediately realized the stability being measured was illusory, the apparent millisecond-long stability was in fact a millisecond-long delay in the readings, and the plasma was actually becoming unstable immediately. Artsimovich concluded "we now do not have a single experimental fact indicating long and stable confinement."

=== Baseballs and yin-yang ===
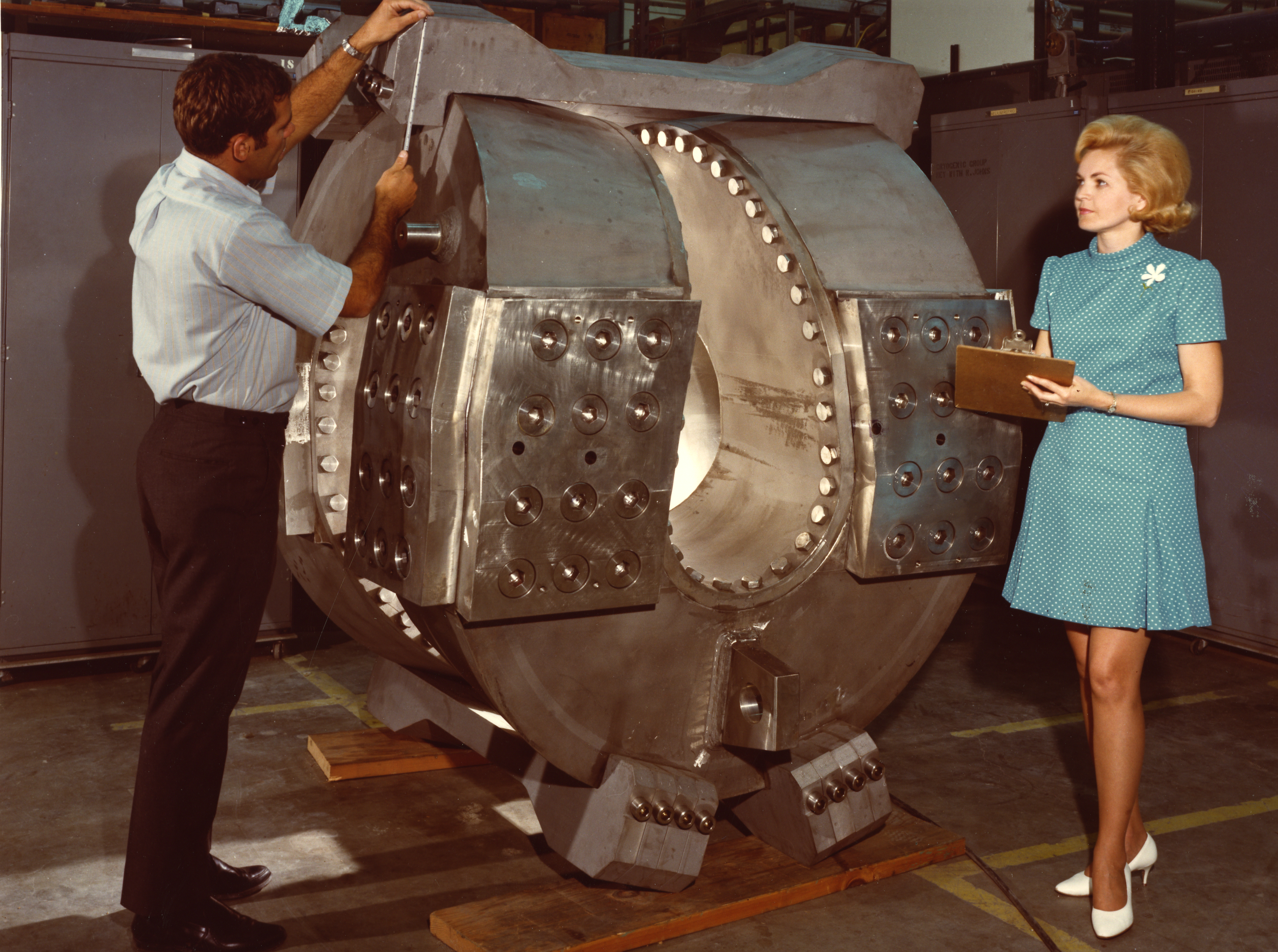
The Baseball II was a superconducting version of the baseball coil design, seen here in 1969 during construction. These designs demonstrated that plasma in a mirror could be stable.

In contrast to the Livermore teams, their Soviet counterparts at the Ioffe Institute were seeing signs of the interchange instability for some time. There was already a significant amount of research on how to avoid this problem, and at the same 1961 meeting, Mikhail Ioffe presented data from one such design, the "minimum-B", which showed clear signals that it was suppressing this instability. This design added additional current-carrying wires that modified the magnetic field to bend the plasma into a bow-tie shape instead of a simple cylinder. The six conductors were known as "Ioffe bars".

A new version of the same basic concept emerged from the UK, the "tennis ball", which was quickly picked up at Livermore, Americanized to "baseball coils", and built in a series of machines known as ALICE, Baseball I and II. These machines used a single magnet which made them much easier to build, and also had the advantage of having a very large internal volume which made it easy to insert diagnostics. The downside to this design was that the magnet was very large relative to the volume of plasma it contained. Livermore's Ken Fowler took this basic design and modified it to produce the "yin-yang" variation, whose magnets were much closer to the plasma. This was built in the 2X series of machines.

As the new baseball machines demonstrated gross stability, it appeared that a working fusion reactor could be built using the design. Of the two designs, baseball and yin-yang, the physicists generally preferred the former as it had easier access for diagnostic systems, and that this would also have an advantage in a real reactor as it allowed easier access for maintenance.

=== Tokamak stampede ===
These results were emerging in the early 1970s, which coincided with the 1970s energy crisis, and a resulting massive infusion of capital by the US federal government into new forms of energy. The fusion directorate, now under the direction of Robert L. Hirsch, began to redirect the labs away from pure research towards an effort to make a working reactor design. The tokamak presented an apparent path to that end, and Hirsch began funding several large tokamak development projects in what became known as the "tokamak stampede". He also desired to have at least one backup concept in case something turned up as tokamaks grew larger. The two most successful designs at that time were the theta pinch and mirrors.

Hirsch's assistant, Stephen O. Dean, visited LLNL and told them that to remain in the running, they would have to produce a design that was competitive with the tokamaks in the short term. He noted that in this respect, while baseball might be the better design, in the short term the 2X had higher performance and a better chance of catching up to the tokamaks. The staff at LLNL were insulted that Washington bureaucrats were trying to tell them how to do their jobs, but Dean pointed out that Hirsch already had two of LLNL's other programs shut down, Aston and Levitron. If the lab could not demonstrate a practically significant improvement in performance, they might lose their mirror program as well. He found an ally in the lab's director, John Foster, Jr., who broadly agreed with Dean's assessment of the political situation.

In response, effort on Baseball II was reduced, and a larger machine known as 2XIIB was designed in place of the original 2XII. The major change was the addition of more neutral beam injectors, from two to a total of twelve, which would greatly improve the density and temperature of the plasma. 2XIIB was constructed rapidly and began operations in 1975, quickly meeting the performance goals in terms of temperature and density it had set for itself.

The success of 2XIIB allowed Dean to get permission in April 1976 to fund the construction of what was essentially an enlarged version of 2XIIB known as MX, setting the initial operational date in 1981.

=== Q and tandem mirrors ===
Dean also pointed out that in the longer term, neither baseball or yin-yang seemed to have any obvious advantage in terms of gain, or Q. While MX might match the plasma performance of the newer tokamaks, calculations showed that even in the absolute best case it would be limited to about Q = 1.2, where a commercially useful system would likely need to have 10 or more. Tokamaks did not appear to have any such limit. In order to be relevant after the next series of designs, LLNL would have to come up with a way to greatly improve Q. This sparked off considerable discussion on the topic of "Q enhancement".

The solution was eventually provided by T. Kenneth Fowler at LLNL later in 1976; he and David Baldwin developed the concept now known as the "tandem mirror", in which 2XIIB-like mirrors were placed at either end of a large solenoid between them. The two mirrors would still have relatively low Q on their own, but over time the hot plasma they naturally leaked would heat the fuel in the solenoid to the point where it was undergoing fusion as well. At that point, the amount of power being released was limited only by the size of this central tank, which required much less energy to power than the 2X mirrors at either end. Thus a much larger amount of fuel would be undergoing fusion while requiring only a small amount of additional power.

The problem was that mirrors are naturally symmetrical, if the fuel could flow out one end into the tank it could just as easily flow out the other and escape entirely. To solve this problem, the tandem mirror aimed to create an "ambipolar" plasma. Ideally, this allowed it to contain electrons and ions differently. Because the ions are so much more massive than the electrons they can exist with different speeds simultaneously, whereas the electrons are almost always at high speed. By trapping a volume of ions in the mirrors, electrons would be attracted to the two sides of the reactor, forming an area of negative charge. Higher-energy ions escaping the center of the mirrors would preferentially be attracted towards these negative areas, into the center of the reactor.

=== TMX ===
With this advance suggesting the mirror was in the running for both breakeven and as a practical reactor, LLNL proposed building a smaller machine than MX to test the layout. A formal proposal was presented to the newly-formed Department of Energy on 12 January 1977, and approved that month. Baseball II was disassembled and TMX built in its place, beginning operations in October 1978.

The machine quickly demonstrated that the basic tandem mirror concept was sound. On this basis, LLNL was given the go-ahead to begin the construction of the much larger, and now $200 million, MFTF. MFTF was designed to reach Q = 1, also known as "breakeven", and demonstrate a path towards a power producing design.

=== Thermal barriers and TMX-U ===
As electrons move more freely in a plasma, they tend to leak out of a mirror machine more rapidly than the fuel ions. Over time, this causes the mass of the fuel left inside the mirror to increasingly consist of ions. This, in turn, creates a net positive charge, providing additional forces that help push the fuel out of the mirror, increasing the rate of leakage. It was this leakage that limited the Q of the machine; counteracting it required extremely powerful magnets that demanded large amounts of power and thus reduced the net output.

A number of attempts had been made to address this by injecting new fuel into the ends of the mirror using small particle accelerators. In 1979, Fowler, David Baldwin and Grant Logan suggested a new layout for these injectors that appeared to be able to produce a "thermal barrier" that should greatly reduce the leakage. The idea was to inject new fuel ions into the ends of the mirror cells so the effective temperature on the ends was higher than in the center. This produced a kinetic barrier to fuel in the center tank and could significantly lower leakage rates, thereby further improving Q.

The advance was so great that it appeared the existing MFTF concept, essentially a scaled-up TMX, would serve no purpose. To test barrier the concept, in 1979 Fowler proposed taking TXM offline once its current experimental runs had ended in 1981. It would then be rebuilt with the end cells in the new configuration, as TMX-U. TMX-U was not expected to be available until 1983, which would introduce a lengthy delay in the MFTF project if the same idea was to be used on that design as well. In late 1979, Fowler proposed continuing the construction of MTFT-B with allowances so that the injectors could be modified if need be based on the results from TMX-U. The new director of fusion research, Ed Kinter, approved the plan, and MFTF became MFTF-B, for "barrier".

Ultimately, this plan proved unwise. When TMX-U began operations it was clear that the improvements from the new injectors was nowhere near what was hoped of them. When these results were scaled up to the MFTF-B design, it became clear it would not be able to reach breakeven. Construction of MFTF-B, already well underway, was allowed to continue, but the project was defunded and closed on 22 February 1986, the day after its construction was declared complete. TMX-U fired its last shots the same month. Dean would later comment that in their effort to catch up to tokamaks the mirror program was pushed too hard.

LLNL, who had received $720 million since 1974 for their mirror program, shut down their mirror program and turned its attention to the inertial confinement fusion approach. Mirror programs at MIT (Tara) and the University of Wisconsin (Phaedrus) were defunded the next year.

== Design ==
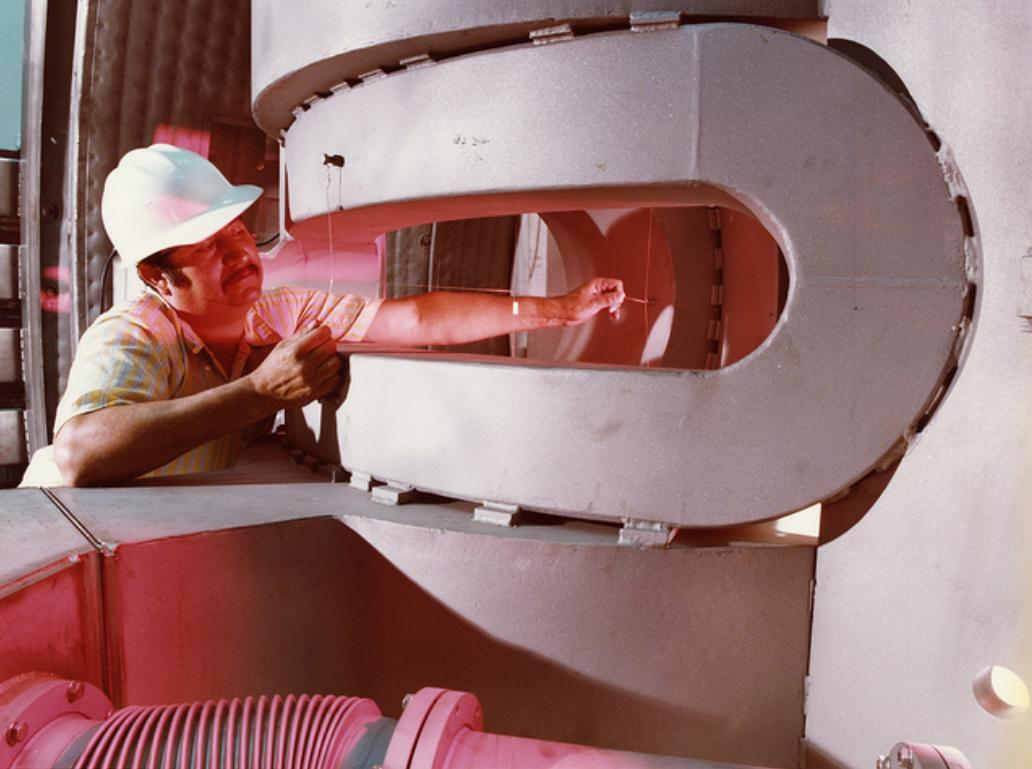
A worker checks the alignment of part of the shaped baseball coils.

The TMX was formally proposed by Fred Coensgen and the Livermore team on January 12, 1977 to the US Energy Research and Development Administration. The project was projected to cost 11 million dollars. The design consisted of five rings of current around the plasma. The ends uses shaped "Baseball" magnets at the end to stop plasma from escaping. This design produced magnetic forces that increase in every direction away from the center of the mirror region. A fusion plasma shaped like a twisted bow tie is confined inside a magnetic mirror. Designing appropriate plugs was a challenge for all magnetic mirror machines. The baseball design was later replaced by the exotic yin-yang magnets of the MFTF. Problems with escaping plasma led researchers towards the Tokamak where plugs were eliminated by looping the field together.

== TMX-U ==
A summary of results from the original runs with TMX was published in February 1981. At this time, the facility underwent a major overhaul. A thermal barrier was added to better contain the plasma, the number of rings was increased to over ten the vacuum and diagnostic system was overhauled and extra magnets were added to plug up losses. The new machine was referred to as the "TMX-U" and it operated into the late eighties.

== Criticism ==
Lawrence Lidsky famously criticized the magnetic mirror machines by saying: "They kept adding one set of magnets a year until it collapsed under its own weight" and in his article "The Trouble With Fusion."
