= Astron (fusion reactor) =

Unfinished fusion reactor

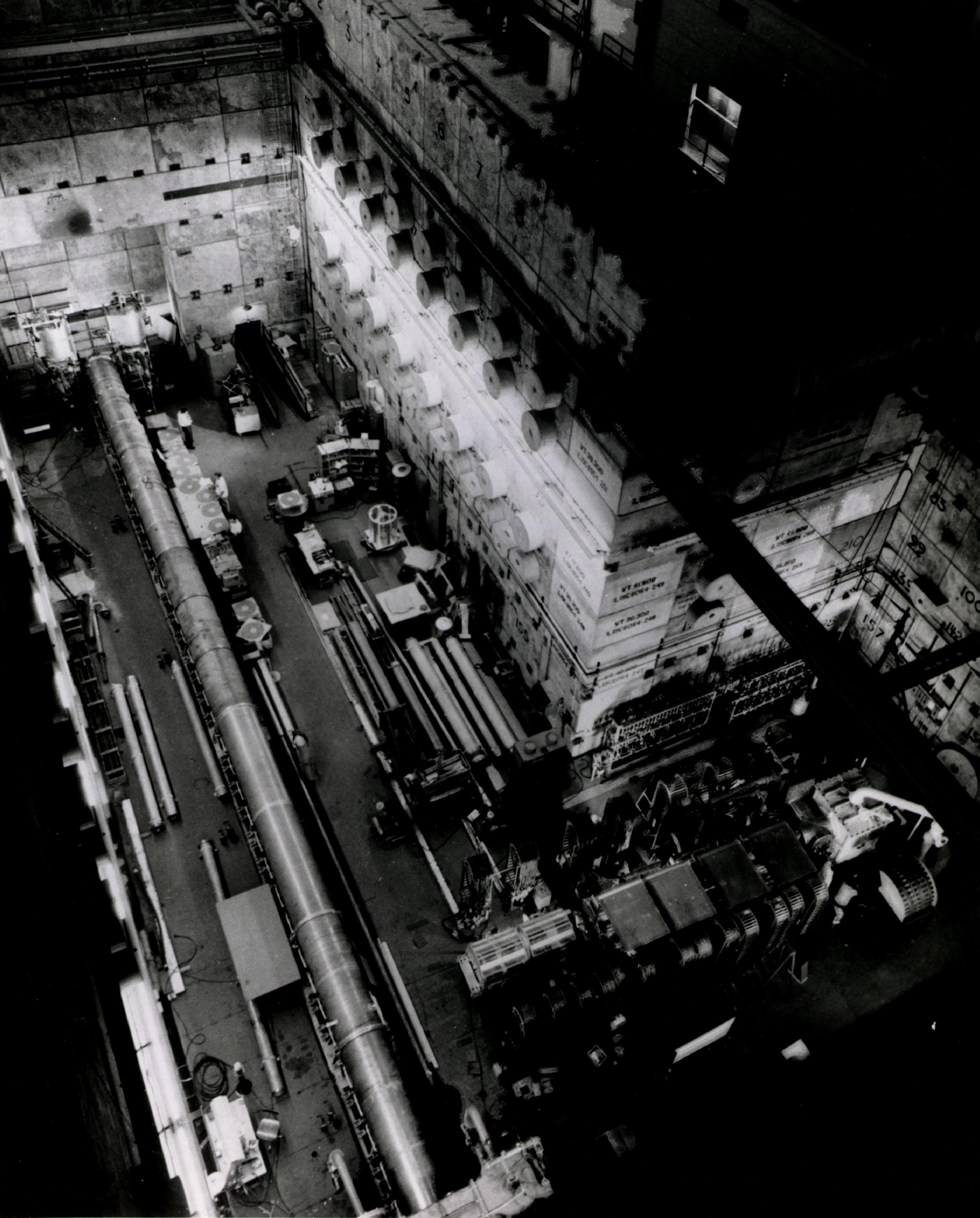
View from above of the Astron which was operated for the Atomic Energy Commission.

The Astron is a type of fusion power device pioneered by Nicholas Christofilos and built at the Lawrence Livermore National Laboratory during the 1960s and 70s. Astron used a unique confinement system that avoided several of the problems found in contemporary designs like the stellarator and magnetic mirror. Development was greatly slowed by a series of changes to the design that were made with limited oversight, leading to a review committee being set up to oversee further development. The Astron was unable to meet the performance goals set for it by the committee; funding was cancelled in 1972 and development wound down in 1973. Work on similar designs appears to have demonstrated a theoretical problem in the very design that suggests it could never be used for practical generation.

== History ==
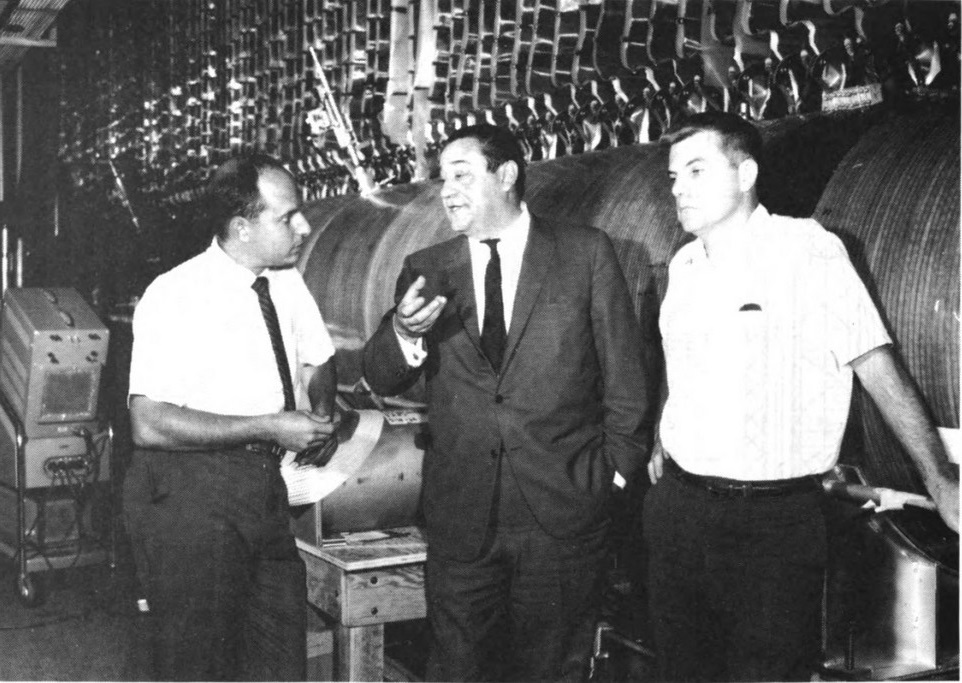
Paul Weiss, Nicholas Christofilos, and Eugene Laurer in front of the Astron

=== Strong focusing ===
Christofilos is best known for independently inventing the concept of strong focusing, a feature used in particle accelerators. He had first started work along these lines in the late 1940s while running an elevator installation company in Greece, and in 1948 he wrote a letter to what was then the University of California's Radiation Laboratory at Berkeley outlining several ideas on accelerator focusing. When they returned his letter pointing out several problems, he solved these and wrote them again. This second letter was ignored. In 1950 Christofilos filed a patent application, which was granted in 1956 as US Patent 2,736,799.

Around the same time, Ernest Courant, Milton Stanley Livingston, and Hartland Snyder of Brookhaven National Laboratory were considering the same problem and devised the same solution, writing about it in the 1 December 1952 issue of Physical Review. When he saw the paper, Christofilos arranged a trip to the US, arriving two months later. Making his way to Brookhaven, he angrily accused them of stealing the idea from his patent. He also met with members of the Atomic Energy Commission, and after meeting with his attorneys, they paid him $10,000 for the patent.

=== Astron proposal ===
With the patent purchase came some fame and enough money that Christofilos was able to enter the US physics world. In April 1953 he attended a meeting of Project Sherwood, and presented another idea he had been working on in Greece, the Astron.

The basic idea was to inject high-energy electrons into a magnetic mirror (the "tank"). The electrons would be captured in the mirror, and build up a layer of current near the outside surface of the tank volume, which he called the "E-layer". The E-layer would itself produce a powerful magnetic field as it built up, and once the current reached a critical density, the fields would "reverse", and fold into a new configuration of closed lines that formed a continuous confinement area. Once the E-layer had successfully formed, fusion fuel would be injected into the area inside it, and heated by interactions with the E-layer to bring it to fusion temperatures.

This arrangement solved one of the main problems with the basic magnetic mirror concept, which had open field lines at the ends. Fuel could follow these lines right out of the reactor. Mirrors thus naturally leaked plasma, although designers believed they could address this problem by operating the machines at very high temperatures. In practice the leakage proved to be even higher than basic theory suggested, and never operated at the levels they hoped to achieve.

At the time, Sherwood was still secret, which presented problems when he first outlined the concept. Prior to his taking the stage, the formulas from the previous session on the blackboard had been carefully erased. As he filled the blackboard with his own equations, someone helpfully showed him the buttons that would raise it and reveal a fresh one underneath. This one had not been erased and led to a rushed effort to prevent any sensitive material leaking. Looking to avoid a repeat event, Christofilos was given a job at Brookhaven, where he could continue working on the Astron theory.

=== Astron testing ===
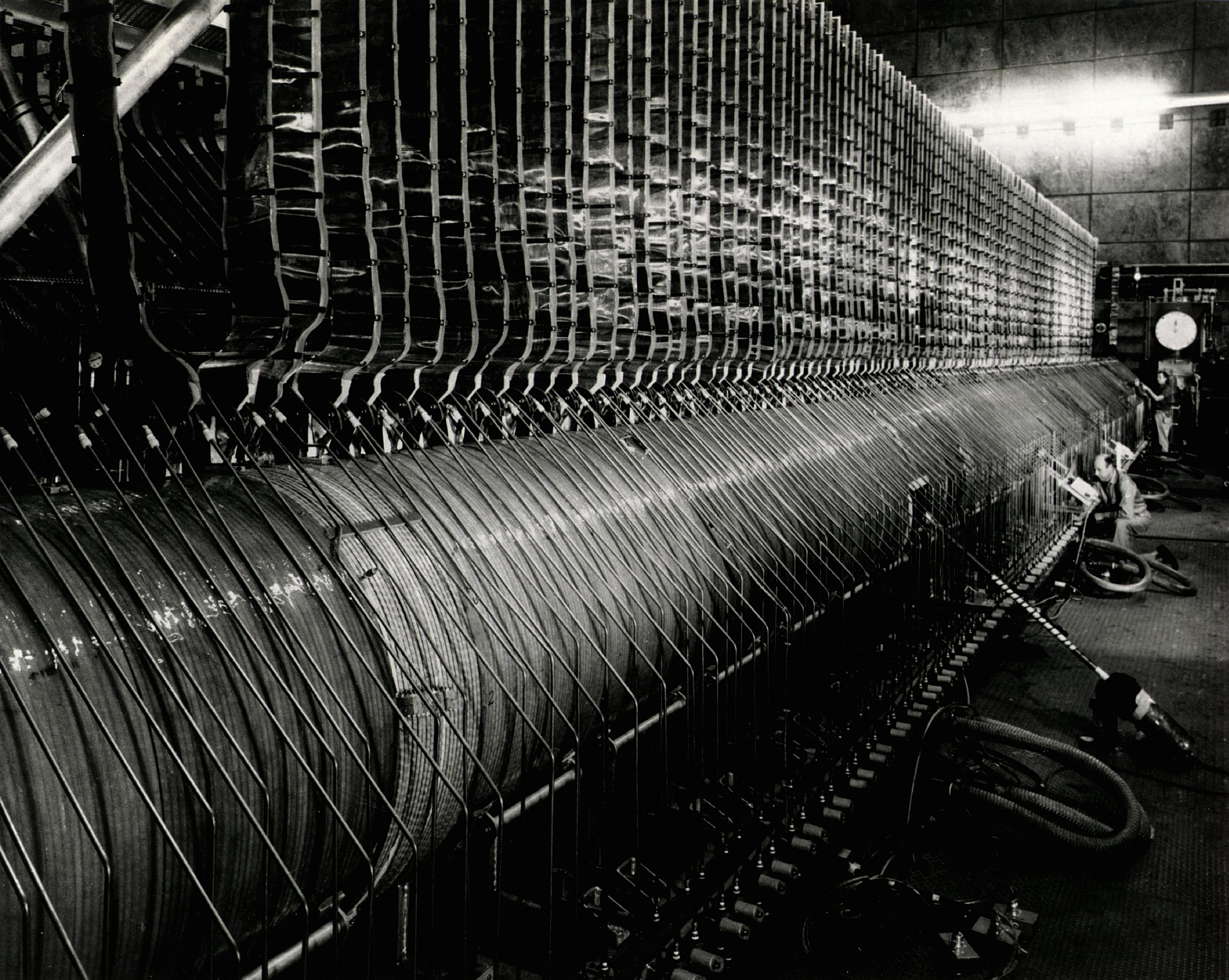
A side view of the Astron device, circa 1966. A single-layer solenoid, 92 feet (28 m) long, is built around an aluminum vacuum vessel.

In 1956, Christofilos finally received his security clearance, and he immediately moved to what was now the Lawrence Livermore National Laboratory (LLNL) to start work on the Astron concept. After two years enough progress had been made that he was able to present the idea at the 1958 Atoms for Peace conference in Geneva, along with a model of the system they proposed to build. This consisted of two main parts, the magnetic bottle where the plasma would be held, and a particle accelerator that provided the relativistic electrons.

Despite his success, Christofilos was always an outsider at the lab. Time reported that "He still has no degree in physics, and his Greek accent, Greek volubility and love of passionate argument keep him an outsider." This led to friction within the physics establishment, and early calls for termination of the Astron program. A 1963 review of the entire Project Sherwood effort led to formal calls for cancellation. However, the program had backers within the management of the controlled fusion program, notably Glenn Seaborg and John S. Foster, both with strong ties to LLNL. Foster, in particular, was concerned about groups in Washington dictating development to the labs. After considerable argument, it was decided that the program would be allowed to continue, but would need to demonstrate field reversal by 1965.

By 1963 the team had designed and built a new type of linear induction accelerator with the required properties. The accelerator design led to interest as a particle beam weapon studied under Project Seesaw. However, during construction the team realized that the electrons were free to travel back into the accelerator area. Christofilos solved this by introducing resistor wires that slightly slowed the electrons after entering the tank, so they no longer possessed the energy needed to flow back out.

After some work ironing out bugs, the first results were published in June 1964. The accelerator worked, operating at 4 MeV and 120 amps, and a stable E-layer was confirmed, albeit generating only 2 A/cm of current, just 0.05% of the diamagnetic field required to reverse the field. Work continued to meet the 1965 goal of reversal, but ultimately failed. However, the electron layer was stable, so the Herb-Allison committee recommended it continue to the next milepost.

By 1967 this had been improved to 6%, but was still a long way from the stable E-layer the device needed to achieve. In 1968, Christofilos and T. Kenneth Fowler wrote a report asking for a more powerful accelerator, and upgrades to the tank.

=== Scrutiny ===
Funds for the upgrades were eventually granted, but only at the cost of direct oversight by an Ad Hoc Panel created by the AEC. By this point the "conventional" designs, the stellarator and magnetic mirror, had long been working on real-world plasmas and were slowly increasing the pressures and temperatures. Astron, on the other hand, was still a long way from building its first useful E-layer, a prerequisite for plasma experiments.

The Ad Hoc Panel returned a negative report, complaining that far too much effort had been put into operational issues like accelerator performance, with little or no effort into theoretical studies on whether or not the plasma would ever be stable even if an E-layer could be formed. Moreover, the panel pointed out that no one had seriously studied whether or not an operating and stable Astron would require more power to operate than it would release. This was a serious concern in Astron, because its relativistic electrons would radiate away large amounts of power due to electron synchrotron radiation.

Christofilos had already considered this and suggested that an operational design would use protons in place of the electrons, and would not suffer from the same level of energy losses. However, no such accelerator existed at the time, and the panel was highly skeptical that it would be simple to build.

=== Upgrade ===
The upgrades to Astron went ahead and started operation in 1969. During this period, following the advice of the Panel, the theoretical divisions at LLNL started taking a much more serious look at the concept. Building computer models of the system, they first attacked the problem of "stacking", that individual pulses of electrons from the accelerator did not build up in the E-layer as expected. Bruce Langdon demonstrated that stacking simply would not work.

However, a suggestion by Fowler proved to save the Astron from this problem. He had noted that adding a second magnetic field running down the centre of the tank would reduce the amount of external field needed to create the E-layer. Christofilos went ahead with this change and started testing in 1971; this demonstrated greatly improved performance both with the reduction in current and success in trapping the electrons. This also allowed two pulses to be stacked, raising the field to 15% diamagnetic strength.

While Astron worked towards multiple pulses, a team at Cornell University had been working on a similar design. However, this Relativistic Electron Coil Experiment (RECE) used a single long pulse of electrons rather than the stacking concept. Late in 1971 they announced they had achieved complete field reversal. Christofilos was unimpressed; this design would not be useful for a steady state fusion generator, only by continually adding pulses could the machine maintain itself.

=== Cancellation ===
Faced with the continued problems with Astron, and the seeming ease that the RECE team had managed to reach the goals they had originally suggested in 1968, a second Ad Hoc Panel published a scathing report. Among the problems they noted that the Astron team had been looking "for ingenious ways to avoid or circumvent difficulties rather than to understand them." Roy Gould, head of the AEC's controlled fusion program, was specific in allowing the Astron project to continue, but only if it met a series of goals on a specific timeline.

When Robert Hirsch took over the AEC's controlled fusion arm in 1972, he instituted a sweeping review to classify the approaches under study and eliminate duplication and low-payoff projects. Given the exciting results with the tokamak released in 1968, Hirsch favoured a program with relatively few projects each given much larger budgets. Many programs like Astron simply didn't appear to have any near-term payoff, and Hirsch was keen to cancel them.

On 24 September 1972, Christofilos met with James Schlesinger of the AEC, but no record of the meeting remains. After a long day, he went to a local Holiday Inn to save a long commute home. That night he suffered a massive heart attack and died.

Richard Briggs took over direction of the project until its planned shutdown date in June 1973. Under his direction, Astron returned to study of the new stabilizing field introduced by Fowler, and using single larger pulses the device hit 50% diamagnetic strength, much greater than Christofilos' efforts with pulse chains. Their final report stated that "buildup of the E-layer by multiple-pulse injection was generally unsuccessful" and noted that at the time of the shutdown they still did not understand what physics problem was limiting the buildup.

=== After Astron ===
Although Astron shut down, work continued with RECE at Cornell for some time. As part of their work, the team attempted to make the switch from electrons to protons. However, as some suspected, the "P-layer" proved difficult to build, and field reversal with protons was never achieved. The last version of this effort, FIREX, shut down in 2003, having demonstrated what appears to be a purely theoretical reason why the Astron concept will never work.

The relativistic electron ring also played a part in the bumpy torus design. This was another attempt to "plug the ends" of mirrors, by linking a number of mirrors end-to-end to form a torus. Electrons were driven to high energies not through direct injection, but external microwave-driven electron-cyclotron heating (ECH).

== Description ==
The Astron device consisted of two sections, the linear accelerator and the magnetic mirror "tank". These were constructed at right angles, with the accelerator's output firing into the side of the tank at one end.

The tank was a relatively simple example of the magnetic mirror concept, consisting largely of a long solenoid with additional windings at both ends to increase the magnetic field in those regions and form the mirror. In a simple mirror the ions in the fuel plasma were injected at an angle so they could not simply flow right out of the ends where the field was roughly linear. However, there was an annular region on either end where ions of the right energy could escape, and various calculations demonstrated the rate would be fairly high.

By injecting electrons into the mirror before the fuel, the E-layer would create a second magnetic field that would cause the annular areas to fold back into the center of the tank. The resulting field was shaped like a tube, and very similar to the Field-Reversed Configuration, or FRC. The main difference between these devices is the way the field reversal is achieved; with the E-layer in the Astron, and by currents in the plasma for the FRC. Like the classic mirror, Astron injected the electrons into the mirror at a slight angle to ensure they would circulate into the center of the mirror.

Today, the Astron is often considered a sub-class of the FRC concept.
