= Direct conversion =

Direct conversion may refer to:

- Direct energy conversion (DEC), a scheme for power extraction from nuclear fusion,
- Direct-conversion receiver (DCR), a type of radio receiver.
