= Direct energy conversion =

Converting a charged particle's kinetic energy into voltage

Direct energy conversion (DEC) or simply direct conversion converts a charged particle's kinetic energy into a voltage. It is a scheme for power extraction from nuclear fusion.

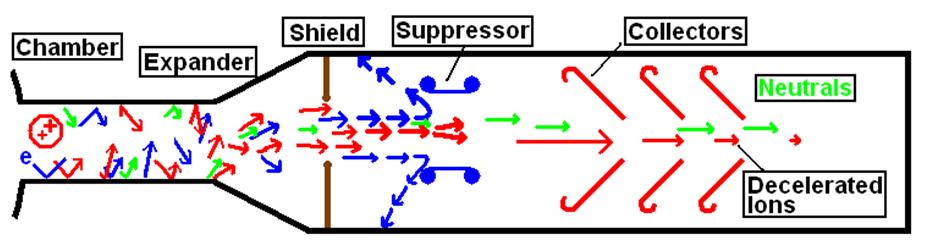
A basic direct converter

== History and theoretical underpinnings ==
=== Electrostatic direct collectors ===
In the middle of the 1960s direct energy conversion was proposed as a method for capturing the energy from the exhaust gas in a fusion reactor. This would generate a direct current of electricity. Richard F. Post at the Lawrence Livermore National Laboratory was an early proponent of the idea. Post reasoned that capturing the energy would require five steps: (1) Ordering the charged particles into linear beam. (2) Separation of positives and negatives. (3) Separating the ions into groups, by their energy. (4) Gathering these ions as they touch collectors. (5) Using these collectors as the positive side in a circuit. Post argued that the efficiency was theoretically determined by the number of collectors.

==== The Venetian blind ====
The Venetian blind design is a type of electrostatic direct collector. The Venetian Blind design name comes from the visual similarity of the ribbons to venetian window blinds. Designs in the early 1970s by William Barr and Ralph Moir used repeating metal ribbons at a specified angle as the ion collector plates. These metal ribbon-like surfaces are more transparent to ions going forward than to ions going backward. Ions pass through surfaces of successively increasing potential until they turn and start back, along a parabolic trajectory. They then see opaque surfaces and are caught. Thus ions are sorted by energy with high-energy ions being caught on high-potential electrodes.

William Barr and Ralph Moir then ran a group which did a series of direct energy conversion experiments through the late 1970s and early 1980s. The first experiments used beams of positives and negatives as fuel, and demonstrated energy capture at a peak efficiency of 65 percent and a minimum efficiency of 50 percent. The following experiments involved a true plasma direct converter that was tested on the Tandem Mirror Experiment (TMX), an operating magnetic mirror fusion reactor. In the experiment, the plasma moved along diverging field lines, spreading it out and converting it into a forward moving beam with a Debye length of a few centimeters. Suppressor grids then reflect the electrons, and collector anodes recovered the ion energy by slowing them down and collecting them at high-potential plates. This machine demonstrated an energy capture efficiency of 48 percent. However, Marshall Rosenbluth argued that keeping the plasma's neutral charge over the very short Debye length distance would be very challenging in practice, though he said that this problem would not occur in every version of this technology.

The Venetian Blind converter can operate with 100 to 150 keV D-T plasma, with an efficiency of about 60% under conditions compatible with economics, and an upper technical conversion efficiency up to 70% ignoring economic limitations.

==== Periodic electrostatic focusing ====
A second type of electrostatic converter initially proposed by Post, then developed by Barr and Moir, is the Periodic Electrostatic Focusing concept. Like the Venetian Blind concept, it is also a direct collector, but the collector plates are disposed in many stages along the longitudinal axis of an electrostatic focusing channel. As each ion is decelerated along the channel toward zero energy, the particle becomes "over-focused" and is deflected sideways from the beam, then collected. The Periodic Electrostatic Focusing converter typically operates with a 600 keV D-T plasma (as low as 400 keV and up to 800 keV) with efficiency of about 60% under conditions compatible with economics, and an upper technical conversion efficiency up to 90% ignoring economic limitations.

=== Induction systems ===
==== Conduction systems ====
From the 1960s through the 1970s, methods have been developed to extract electrical energy directly from a hot gas (a plasma) in motion within a channel fitted with electromagnets (producing a transverse magnetic field), and electrodes (connected to load resistors). Charge carriers (free electrons and ions) incoming with the flow are then separated by the Lorentz force and an electric potential difference can be retrieved from pairs of connected electrodes. Shock tubes used as pulsed MHD generators were for example able to produce several megawatts of electricity in channels the size of a beverage can.

==== Induction systems ====
In addition to converters using electrodes, pure inductive magnetic converters have also been proposed by Lev Artsimovich in 1963, then Alan Frederic Haught and his team from United Aircraft Research Laboratories in 1970, and Ralph Moir in 1977.

The magnetic compression-expansion direct energy converter is analogous to the internal combustion engine. As the hot plasma expands against a magnetic field, in a manner similar to hot gases expanding against a piston, part of the energy of the internal plasma is inductively converted to an electromagnetic coil, as an EMF (voltage) in the conductor.

This scheme is best used with pulsed devices, because the converter then works like a "magnetic four-stroke engine":

1. Compression: A column of plasma is compressed by a magnetic field that acts like a piston.
2. Thermonuclear burn: The compression heats the plasma to the thermonuclear ignition temperature.
3. Expansion/Power: The expansion of fusion reaction products (charged particles) increases the plasma pressure and pushes the magnetic field outward. A voltage is induced and collected in the electromagnetic coil.
4. Exhaust/Refuel: After expansion, the partially burned fuel is flushed out, and new fuel in the form of gas is introduced and ionized; and the cycle starts again.

In 1973, a team from Los Alamos and Argonne laboratories stated that the thermodynamic efficiency of the magnetic direct conversion cycle from alpha-particle energy to work is 62%.

=== Traveling-wave direct energy converter ===
In 1992, a Japan–U.S. joint-team proposed a novel direct energy conversion system for 14.7 MeV protons produced by D-^{3}He fusion reactions, whose energy is too high for electrostatic converters.

The conversion is based on a Traveling-Wave Direct Energy Converter (TWDEC). A gyrotron converter first guides fusion product ions as a beam into a 10-meter long microwave cavity filled with a 10-tesla magnetic field, where 155 MHz microwaves are generated and converted to a high voltage DC output through rectennas.

The Field-Reversed Configuration reactor ARTEMIS in this study was designed with an efficiency of 75%. The traveling-wave direct converter has a maximum projected efficiency of 90%.

=== Inverse cyclotron converter (ICC) ===
Original direct converters were designed to extract the energy carried by 100 to 800 keV ions produced by D-T fusion reactions. Those electrostatic converters are not suitable for higher energy product ions above 1 MeV generated by other fusion fuels like the D-^{3}He or the p-^{11}B aneutronic fusion reactions.

A much shorter device than the Traveling-Wave Direct Energy Converter has been proposed in 1997 and patented by Tri Alpha Energy, Inc. as an Inverse Cyclotron Converter (ICC).

The ICC is able to decelerate the incoming ions based on experiments made in 1950 by Felix Bloch and Carson D. Jeffries, in order to extract their kinetic energy. The converter operates at 5 MHz and requires a magnetic field of only 0.6 tesla. The linear motion of fusion product ions is converted to circular motion by a magnetic cusp. Energy is collected from the charged particles as they spiral past quadrupole electrodes. More classical electrostatic collectors would also be used for particles with energy less than 1 MeV. The Inverse Cyclotron Converter has a maximum projected efficiency of 90%.

=== X-ray photoelectric converter ===
A significant amount of the energy released by fusion reactions is composed of electromagnetic radiation, essentially X-rays due to Bremsstrahlung. Those X-rays can not be converted into electric power with the various electrostatic and magnetic direct energy converters listed above, and their energy is lost.

Whereas more classical thermal conversion has been considered with the use of a radiation/boiler/energy exchanger where the X-ray energy is absorbed by a working fluid at temperatures of several thousand degrees, more recent research done by companies developing nuclear aneutronic fusion reactors, like Lawrenceville Plasma Physics (LPP) with the Dense Plasma Focus, and Tri Alpha Energy, Inc. with the Colliding Beam Fusion Reactor (CBFR), plan to harness the photoelectric and Auger effects to recover energy carried by X-rays and other high-energy photons. Those photoelectric converters are composed of X-ray absorber and electron collector sheets nested concentrically in an onion-like array. Indeed, since X-rays can go through far greater thickness of material than electrons can, many layers are needed to absorb most of the X-rays. LPP announces an overall efficiency of 81% for the photoelectric conversion scheme.

== Direct energy conversion from fission products ==
In the early 2000s, research was undertaken by Sandia National Laboratories, Los Alamos National Laboratory, The University of Florida, Texas A&M University and General Atomics to use direct conversion to extract energy from fission reactions, essentially, attempting to extract energy from the linear motion of charged particles coming off a fission reaction.

== See also ==
- Antiproton Decelerator
- Cherenkov radiation
- Landau damping
