= Lidsky =

Lidsky is a surname. Notable people with the surname include:

- Isaac Lidsky (born 1979), American author, actor and entrepreneur
- Lawrence Lidsky (1935–2002), American physicist
