= National Compact Stellarator Experiment =

Magnetic fusion energy experiment

NCSX
National Compact Stellarator eXperiment
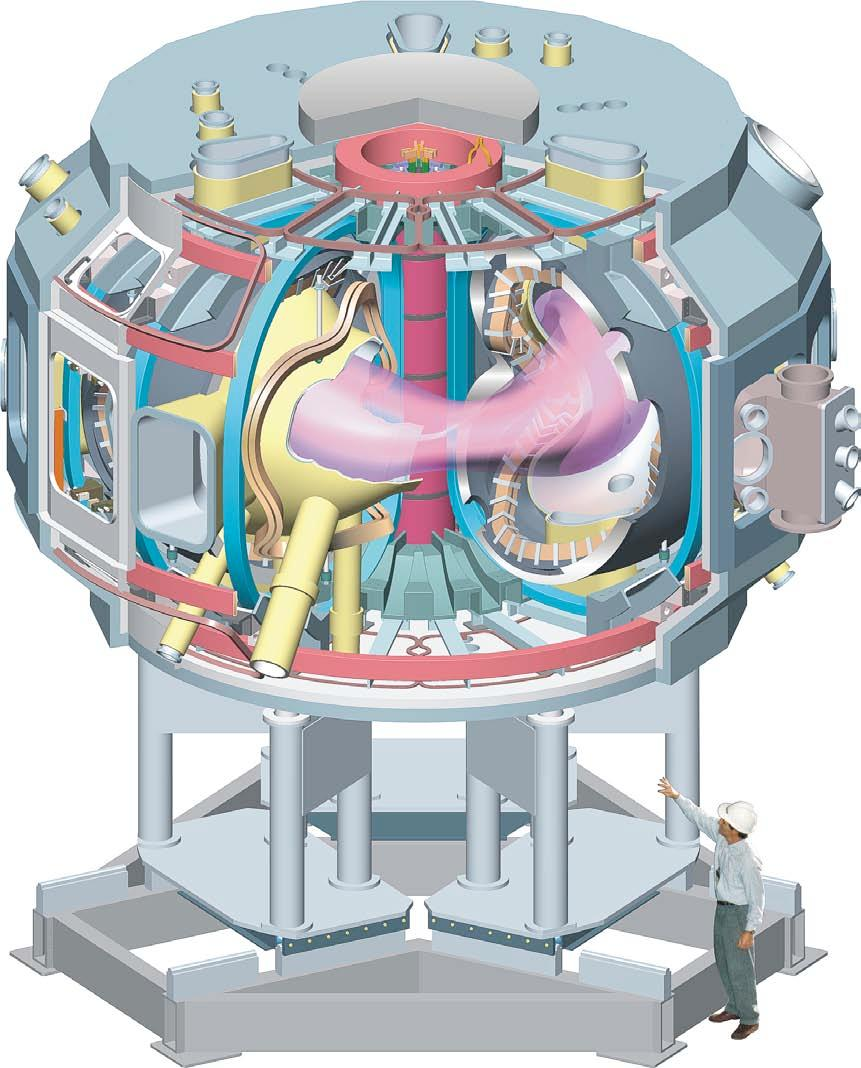
- Design drawing of NCSX
- Location: Princeton, New Jersey, US
- Affiliation: Princeton Plasma Physics Laboratory

Technical specifications
- Major radius: 1.4 m (4 ft 7 in)
- Minor radius: 0.32 m (1 ft 1 in)
- Plasma volume: 3 m^{3}
- Magnetic field: <2.0 T (20,000 G)
- Plasma current: 320 kA

History
- Date(s) of construction: 2004 - 2008 (canceled, 80% complete)
- Preceded by: Model C stellarator

The National Compact Stellarator Experiment, NCSX in short, was a magnetic fusion energy experiment based on the stellarator design being constructed at the Princeton Plasma Physics Laboratory (PPPL).

NCSX was one of a number of new stellarator designs from the 1990s that arose after studies illustrated new geometries that offered better performance than the simpler machines of the 1950s and 1960s. Compared to the more common tokamak, these were much more difficult to design and build, but produced far more stable plasma, the main problem with successful fusion.

The design proved to be too difficult to build, repeatedly running over its budget and timelines. The project was eventually cancelled on 22 May 2008, having spent over $70 M.

Wendelstein 7-X explores many of the same concepts that NCSX intended to.

== History ==
=== Early stellarators ===
Stellarators are one of the first fusion power concepts, originally designed by Princeton astrophysicist Lyman Spitzer in 1952 while riding the chairlifts at Aspen. Spitzer, considering the motion of plasmas in the stars, realized that any simple arrangements of magnets would not confine a plasma inside a machine - the plasma would drift across the fields and eventually strike the vessel. His solution was simple; by bending the machine through a 180 degree twist, forming a figure-eight instead of a donut, the plasma would alternately find itself on the inside or outside of the vessel, drifting in opposite directions. The cancellation of net drift would not be perfect, but on paper, it appeared that the delay in drift rates was more than enough to allow the plasma to reach fusion conditions.

In practice, this proved not to be. A problem seen in all fusion reactor designs of the era was that the plasma ions were drifting much faster than classical theory predicted, hundreds to thousands of times faster. Designs that suggested stability on the order of seconds turned into machines that were stable for microseconds at best. By the mid-1960s the entire fusion energy field appeared stalled. It was only the 1968 introduction of the tokamak design that rescued the field; Soviet machines were performing at least an order of magnitude better than western designs, although still far short of practical values. The improvement was so dramatic that work on other designs largely ended as teams around the world began to study the tokamak approach. This included the latest stellarator designs; the Model C had started operations in 1962, and was rapidly converted into the Symmetric Tokamak in 1969/70.

By the late 1980s it was clear that while the tokamak was a great step forward, it also introduced new problems. In particular, the plasma current the tokamak used for stabilization and heating was itself a source of instabilities as the current grew. Much of the subsequent 30 years of tokamak development has focused on ways to increase this current to the levels required to sustain useful fusion while ensuring that same current does not cause the plasma to break up.

=== Compact stellarators ===
As the magnitude of the problem with the tokamak became evident, fusion teams around the world began to take a fresh look at other design concepts. Among a number of ideas noted during this process, the stellarator in particular appeared to have a number of potential changes that would greatly improve its performance.

The basic idea of the stellarator was to use the layout of the magnets to cancel out ion drift, but the simple designs of the 1950s did not do this to the degree needed. A greater problem were the instabilities and collisional effects that greatly increased the diffusion rates. In the 1980s it was noted that one way to improve tokamak performance was to use non-circular cross-sections for the plasma confinement area; ions moving in these non-uniform areas would mix and break up the formation of large-scale instabilities. Applying the same logic to the stellarator appeared to offer the same advantages. Yet, as the stellarator lacked, or lowered, the plasma current, the plasma would be more stable from the start.

When one considers the magnet layout needed to achieve both goals, a twisted path around the circumference of the device as well as many smaller twists and mixes along the way, the design becomes extremely complex, well beyond the abilities of conventional design tools. It was only through the use of massively parallel computers that the designs could be studied in depth, and suitable magnet designs created. The result was a very compact device, significantly smaller outside than a classical design for any given volume of plasma, with a low aspect ratio. Lower aspect ratios are highly desirable, because they allow a machine of any given power to be smaller, which lowers construction costs.

By the late 1990s the studies into new stellarator designs had reached a suitable point for the construction of a machine using these concepts. In comparison to the stellarators of the 1960s, the new machines could use superconducting magnets for much higher field strengths, be only slightly larger than the Model C yet have far larger plasma volume, and have a plasma area inside that varied from circular to planar and back while twisting several times.

== NCSX design ==
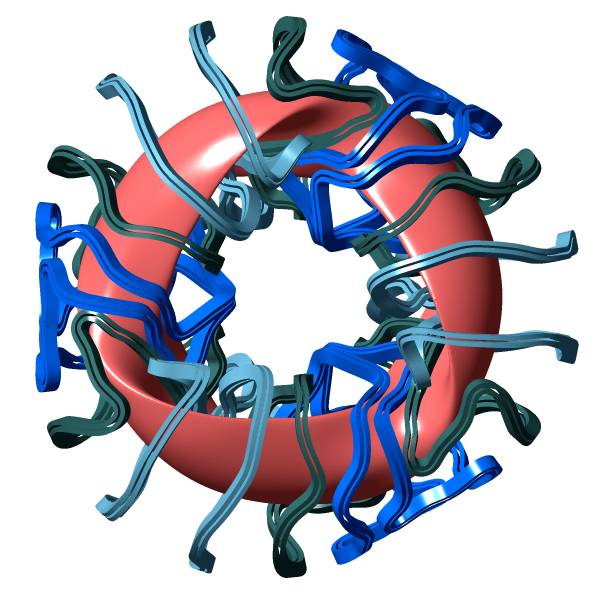
Modular coils and predicted plasma shape

Plasma details

- Major radius : 1.4m, Aspect ratio : 4.4,
- Magnetic field : 1.2 T - 1.7 T (Up to 2 T on axis for 0.2s)
- quasi-axisymmetric field, 3 field periods in all. Aims for beta > 0.04.

Magnet coils

- 18 modular coils (6 each of types A, B, C) of wound copper wire, cooled with liquid nitrogen (LN2),
- 18 toroidal coils, solid copper cooled with LN2,
- 6 pairs of poloidal field coils, solid copper cooled with LN2,
- 48 trim coils.

The 18 modular coils have a complicated 3D shape, ~ 9 different curves in different planes. Some of the coils would need 15 minutes to re-cool between high I^{2}t plasma runs.

Plasma heating
Because the stellarator lacks the tokamak's plasma current as a form of heating, heating the plasma is accomplished with external devices. Up to 12 MW of external heating power would have been available to the NCSX chamber, consisting of 6 MW from tangential neutral beam injection, and 6 MW from radio-frequency (RF) heating (essentially a microwave oven). Up to 3 MW of electron cyclotron heating would also have been available in future iterations of the design.

Baseline total project cost of $102M for completion date of July 2009.

First contracts placed in 2004.

== NCSX construction ==
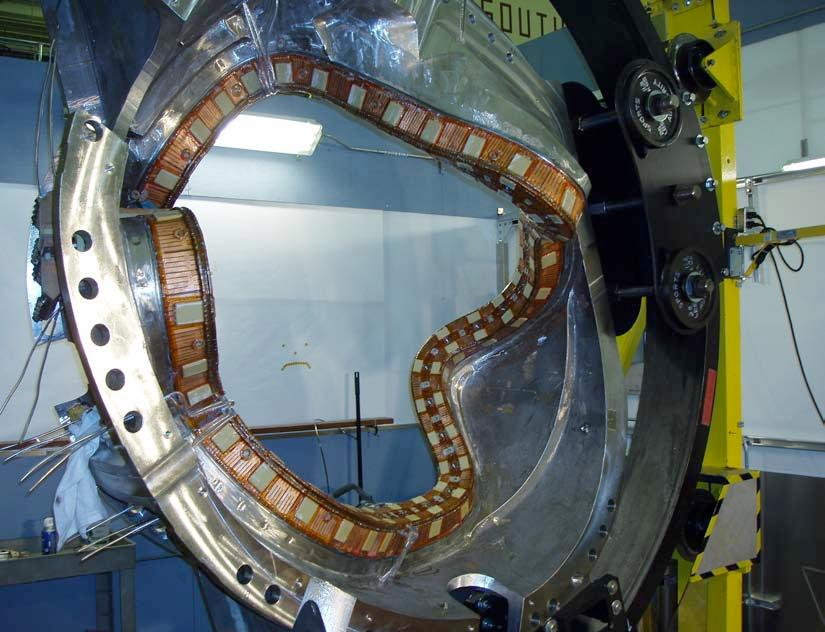
Construction of a modular coil for NCSX

With the design largely complete, the PPPL began the process of building such a machine, the NCSX, which would test all of these concepts. The design used eighteen complicated hand-wound magnets, which then had to be assembled into a machine where the maximum variation from the perfect placement was no more than 1.5 millimetres (0.059 in) across the entire device. The vacuum vessel surrounding all of this was likewise very complex, with the added complication of carrying all of the wiring to feed power to the magnets.

The assembly tolerances were very tight and required state of the art use of metrology systems including Laser Tracker and photogrammetry equipment. $50 million of additional funding was needed, spread over the next 3 years, to complete the assembly within tolerance requirements. Components for the Stellarator were measured with 3d laser scanning, and inspected to design models at multiple stages in the manufacturing process.

The required tolerances could not be achieved; As the modules were assembled, parts were found to be in contact, would sag once installed, and other unexpected effects made alignment very difficult. Fixes were worked into the design, but each one further delayed the completion and required more funding. (The 2008 cost estimate was $170M with an August 2013 scheduled completion.) Eventually a go/no-go condition was imposed, and when the goal was not met on budget, the project was cancelled.

== Legacy ==
Due to its cancellation in 2008, the project has been cited as a case study of the hypothetical demon of Bureaucratic Chaos, which "blocks good things from happening" at the United States Department of Energy. Its fate is reminiscent of other Department of Energy projects, such as the Mirror Fusion Test Facility, which was constructed but never used, and the Superconducting Super Collider, which cost $2 billion prior to its cancellation.

== See also ==
- Wendelstein 7-X
- Helically Symmetric Experiment
