= Richard F. Post =

American physicist (1918–2015)

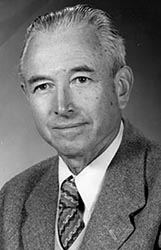
- Richard F. Post c. 1982
- Born: Richard Freeman Post; November 14, 1918; Pomona, California, U.S.
- Died: April 7, 2015 (aged 96); Walnut Creek, California, U.S.
- Education: Pomona College (B.S.); Stanford University (Ph.D.)
- Spouse: Marylee Post
- Children: 3; including Markie
- Relatives: Descendants of Robert Coe
- Awards: James Clerk Maxwell Prize for Plasma Physics (1978)
- Scientific career
- Fields: Nuclear fusion, plasma physics, magnetic mirrors, magnetic levitation, magnetic bearing design, direct energy conversion
- Institutions: Lawrence Livermore National Laboratory

Richard Freeman Post (November 14, 1918 – April 7, 2015) was an American physicist notable for his work in nuclear fusion, plasma physics, magnetic mirrors, magnetic levitation, magnetic bearing design and direct energy conversion.

Post was a winner of the James Clerk Maxwell Prize for Plasma Physics and led the controlled thermonuclear research group at Lawrence Livermore National Laboratory for 23 years. He held a total of 34 patents in the fields of nuclear fusion, particle accelerators, and electronic and mechanical energy storage.

== Early life and education ==
Post was born in Pomona, California, the son of Miriam (Colcord) and Freeman Post. He is a descendant of colonist Robert Coe. He received a BA in physics from Pomona College in 1940 and a PhD in physics from Stanford University in 1951. After his PhD, he was inspired to pursue fusion energy research by a college professor.

== Career ==
Post joined the staff at Lawrence Livermore National Laboratory (LLNL) as leader of the controlled thermonuclear research group until 1974. During this time, he developed many of the concepts behind magnetic mirrors and direct energy conversion. He worked with Marshall Rosenbluth to develop the stability of plasma inside mirror machines. From 1974 to 1987 he was deputy associate director of the magnetic fusion energy program at LLNL. This was a heavily funded effort by the United States Department of Energy to build a succession of magnetic mirror machines, including the Mirror Fusion Test Facility (MFTF) and the Tandem Mirror Facility. After 1987, Post was senior scientist in the magnetic fusion energy program. He has held advisory roles at NASA, the National Academy of Sciences and the United States Air Force.

Post's notable work includes inductrack and magnetically levitated flywheels.

== Personal life ==
Post and his wife Marylee (a poet) were the parents of actress Markie Post and her two brothers, Steve and Rodney. Although he retired in 1994, Post continued to work in his lab four days a week, up until the week of his death on April 7, 2015.
