= Bumpy torus =

Class of magnetic fusion energy devices

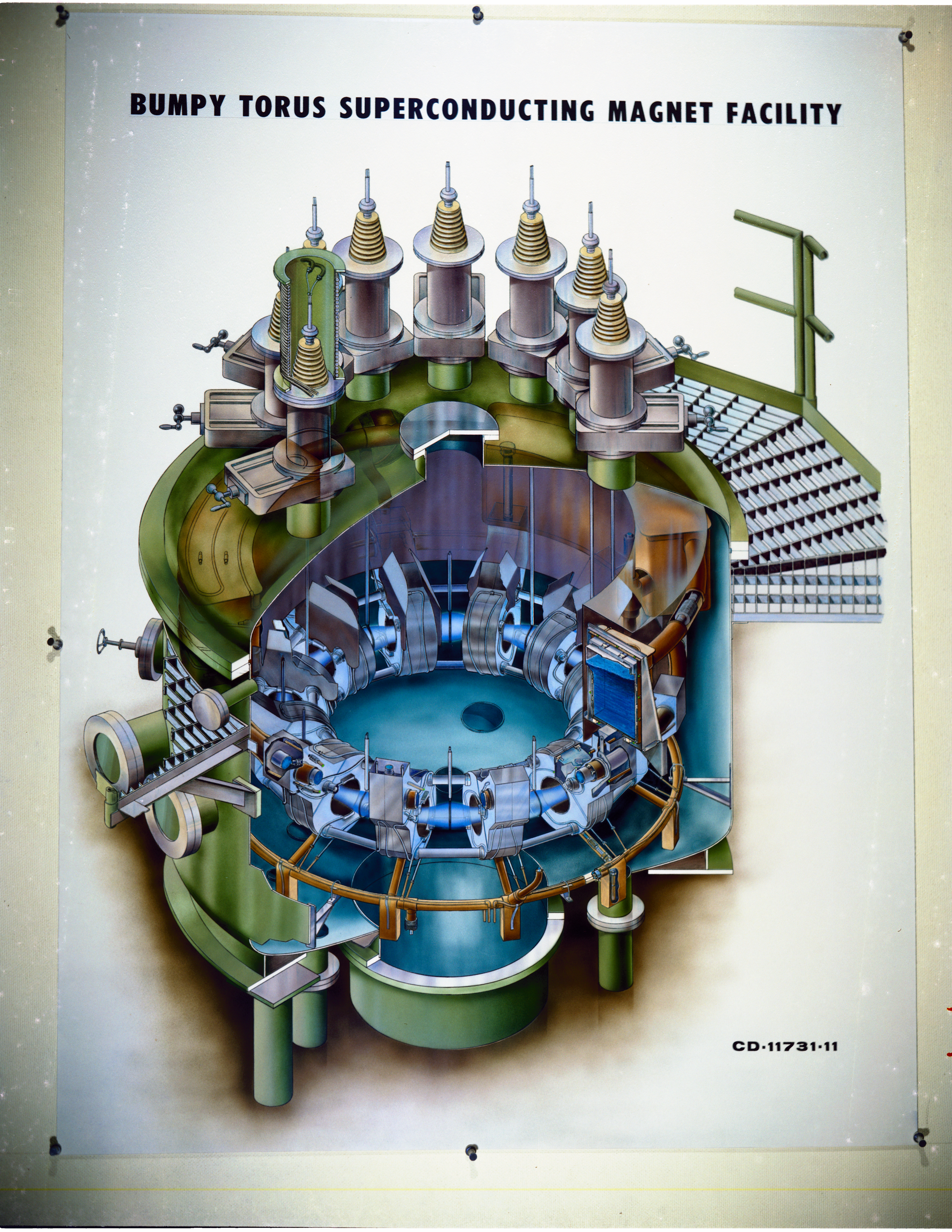
Drawing of bumpy torus facility

The bumpy torus is a class of magnetic fusion energy devices that consist of a series of magnetic mirrors connected end-to-end to form a closed torus. It is based on a discovery made by a team headed by Ray Dandl at Oak Ridge National Laboratory in the 1960s.

The main disadvantage of the classic magnetic mirror design is excessive plasma leakage through the two ends. The bumpy torus addresses this by connecting multiple mirrors together so fuel leaking from one mirror ends up in another. It is described as "bumpy" because the fuel ions comprising the plasma tend to concentrate inside the mirrors at a greater density than the leakage currents between mirror cells. An alternate description is that the magnetic field is narrower between the mirrors than in the center of each segment. Such an arrangement is not stable on its own, and most bumpy torus designs use secondary fields or relativistic electrons to create a stable field inside the reactor.

Bumpy torus designs were an area of active research starting in the 1960s and continued until 1986 with the ELMO (ELectro Magnetic Orbit) Bumpy Torus at the Oak Ridge National Laboratory. One, in particular, has been described: "Imagine a series of magnetic mirror machines placed end to end and twisted into a torus. An ion or electron that leaks out of one mirror cavity finds itself in another mirror cell. This constitutes a bumpy torus." These demonstrated problems and most research on the concept has ended.

== Background ==
=== Simple mirrors ===
The magnetic mirror is among the simplest magnetic fusion energy machines in terms of physical complexity. It consists largely of a cylinder with powerful magnets at each end, although in practice the cylindrical part (technically, a solenoid) is lined with less powerful magnets to better shape the field. The resulting magnetic field has a shape roughly like the outside of a cigar, wide in the center of the cylinder and necking down at either end.

Plasma consists of a gas of charged particles, electrons and the nuclei (ions) of the fusion fuel being used. In the presence of a magnetic field, charged particles orbit the lines of force. They also carry whatever momentum they had along the line of force, so in practice, the resulting motion is a spiral centered on the magnetic line.

The mirror works by the way this motion is "trapped" at either end of the cylinder. As the ions approach the ends, other magnetic lines are converging on the same location, creating a rising field. Given the correct set of conditions, the ion will reverse its motion, essentially bouncing off the increasing field, thus the name mirror. Over a macroscopic time, individual ions bounce back and forth between the two mirror coils, remaining confined within the device.

For any given field arrangement, there always remains some lines of force that are not curved as they approach the ends, most notably, the lines down the center of the mirror. Ions circling these lines may escape. Additionally, for any given magnetic strength, there are always some particles that will have enough energy that they will not reflect, and these too will escape. Calculations suggested that the rate of escape would be low enough to allow a long-running reactor.

=== Minimum B ===
It was pointed out very early in the controlled fusion program that such a device has a natural instability in the magnetic field arrangement. In any area where there is convexity in the field, there is a natural tendency for the ions to want to move to the outside of their original trajectory when they undergo collision. As a result of this motion, they wander outwards through the confinement area. When enough ions do this in any particular area, their electric charge modifies the magnetic field in such a way to further increase the curvature, causing a runaway effect that results in the plasma pouring out of the confinement area. This issue became known as the interchange instability and was found to be endemic to all mirrors of the late 1950s.

The interchange instability was caused by convex areas of magnetic fields, and it was quickly shown by researchers in the UK that the opposite was also true: a concave field, with the plasma on the "inside" of the concavity, would be naturally stable. This became known as the "minimum B configuration". Actually making such a field arrangement that does not leak fuel for other reasons is difficult, but by the mid-1960s several promising designs had emerged, notably the "tennis ball" or "baseball" configuration, and later, the yin-yang concept. All of these had the disadvantage of being much more complex, as well as larger for any given volume of plasma, which has a negative impact on the price performance of the design.

=== Bumpy torus ===
The bumpy torus is an attempt to correct the mirror's problems both with the interchange instability as well as its natural leakage out the ends.

To control leakage, a number of mirrors were connected together end-to-end. This did not, by itself, reduce leakage, instead, it meant that particles leaked into another mirror. This may seem obvious at first glance, but the problem with this approach is that the resulting magnetic field is no longer linear down the axis, but curved, which increases the rate of interchange instability. However, when the machine as a whole is considered, as opposed to examining a single mirror cell, the overall field can be arranged as a net minimum-B configuration.

The bumpy torus' resulting field is subject to another problem, the resistive ballooning mode. The ELMO team at Oak Ridge National Laboratory proposed controlling this by injecting high-energy ("hot") electrons into the space between the outside of the mirror confinement field and the outside of the reactor itself. These electrons would produce a second magnetic field that would force the mirror's natural field away from the walls of the reactor, and modify the field as a whole to reduce the ballooning mode.

=== ELMO ===
The first example of the bumpy torus design was built as the ELMO at Oak Ridge National Laboratory in 1972. At first, the design demonstrated promising results, but as new diagnostic systems were added it became clear the system was not working as designed. In particular, the electron shell concept was nowhere near as powerful as predicted, and to add to the problems, the microwave heating system proved to have far lower efficiency than expected.

A similar system was built in Nagoya, where direct measurement of the magnetic field demonstrated that only a few percent of the field created by the electrons was reaching the inside of the confinement area, not nearly enough to offset the instabilities. In 1988, a review of the entire field suggested that the electron confinement simply did not create the conditions needed, and further interest in the concept ended.
