= Mirror Fusion Test Facility =

Magnetic confinement fusion device

MFTF
Mirror Fusion Test Facility
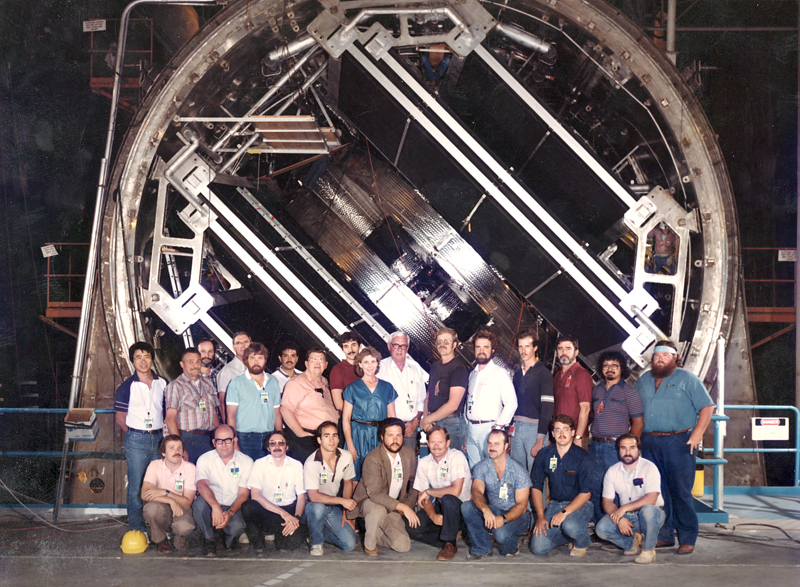
- The mirror fusion test facility during construction in 1983, part of the Yin-Yang magnets can be observed in the background.
- Device type: Magnetic mirror
- Location: Livermore, California, U.S.
- Affiliation: Lawrence Livermore National Laboratory

History
- Date(s) of construction: 1977 – 1986
- Preceded by: 2XIIB
- Related devices: Tandem Mirror Experiment (TMX)

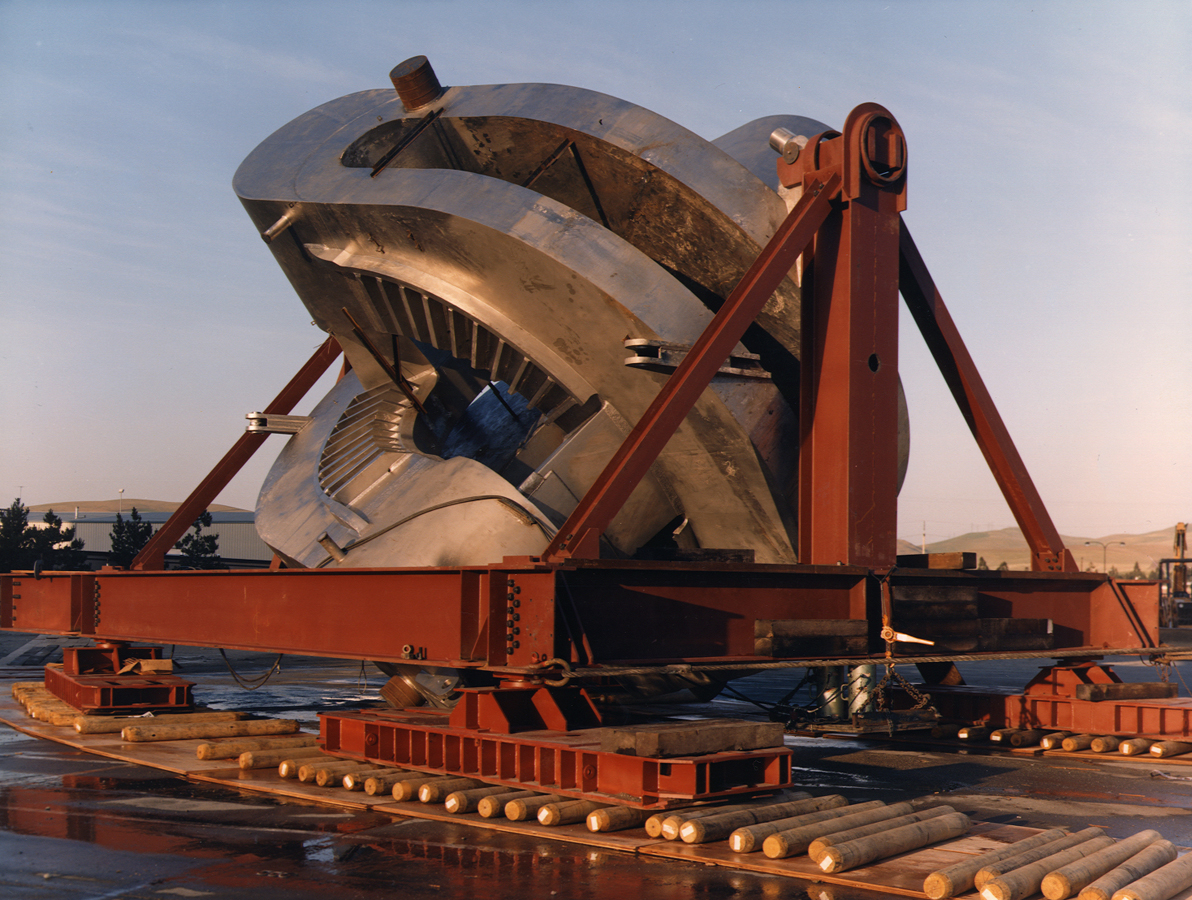
One of the two yin-yang mirrors arrives at LLNL. The plasma was confined in the small area between the two magnets.

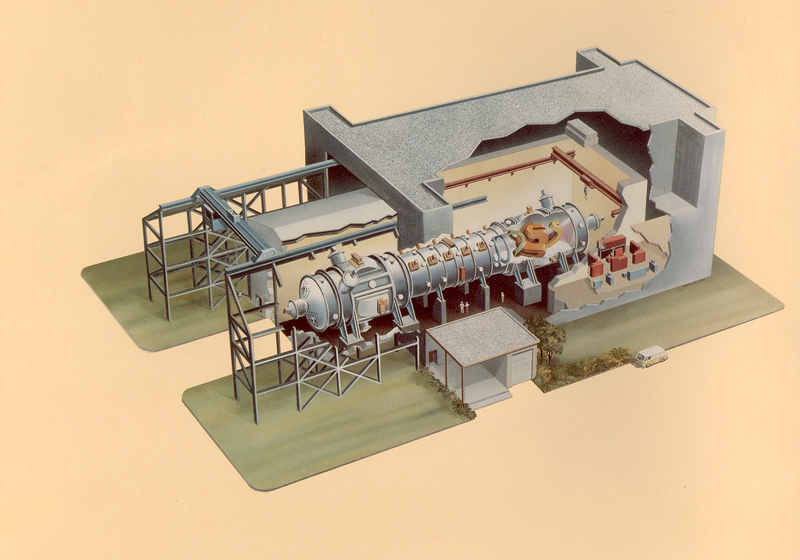
Drawing of the MFTF building

The Mirror Fusion Test Facility, or MFTF, was an experimental magnetic confinement fusion device built using the tandem magnetic mirror design. It was, by far, the largest, most powerful and most expensive mirror machine ever constructed. Due to budget cuts, it was mothballed the day after its construction was complete, and sat unused for a year before being formally cancelled. $372 million were spent on the system during its lifetime.

MFTF was the ultimate development of a series of machines at Lawrence Livermore National Laboratory (LLNL) that trace their history back to the early 1950s. Over the years one problem after another had been addressed, leading to designs using "baseball" and "yin-yang" mirrors. By the late 1960s, it appeared possible to build stable mirrors. However, these changes had also lowered their economic performance, to the point where they appeared unattractive as power generators.

In 1968, the Soviets demonstrated their tokamak systems were outperforming all others by a factor of at least ten. The path to practical fusion appeared open, and in the US, in the mid-1970s, Robert Hirsch began plans to produce a prototype power plant. Having secured a massive budget increase, and desiring a second design in case the tokamak didn't pan out, a study of the alternative concepts suggested the best developed was the mirror. The original MFTF was essentially a very large yin-yang mirror, expected around 1982.

Hirsch's associate, Stephen O. Dean, asked for ideas that would improve the economics of the mirror. This led to the tandem mirror concept, and a redesign as MFTF-B, with the original mirror becoming one end of a much larger machine. To test the new concept, a smaller machine that could be rapidly built was constructed, Tandem Mirror Experiment, or TMX. Construction of MFTF and TMX began in 1977 and TMX began operations in 1979.

By the early 1980s, TMX was beginning to demonstrate serious problems that suggested MFTF-B would not work as predicted. This was occurring around the same time that Ronald Reagan declared that the energy crisis was over. In a series of sweeping budget cuts across the entire energy research field, MFTF had its operational budget cancelled, although its construction budget survived. Construction completed in 1986, and the facility sat unused for a year being scavenged for parts by other researchers until it was formally cancelled in 1987 and disassembled.

== History ==
It was designed and built at Lawrence Livermore National Laboratory (LLNL), one of the primary research centers for mirror fusion devices. It cost $372 million to construct, making it at the time the most expensive project in the lab's history. It opened on February 21, 1986 and was promptly shut down. The reason given was to balance the United States federal budget.

Following on from the earlier Baseball II device, the facility was originally a similar system in which the confinement area was located between two horseshoe-shaped "mirrors".

During construction the success of the Tandem Mirror Experiment ("TMX") led to a redesign to insert a solenoid area between two such magnets, dramatically improving confinement time from a few milliseconds to over one second. Most of the fusion power would be produced in the long solenoid. The yin-yang magnets would then serve only to dam up the ends in order to maintain good plasma confinement in the solenoid. Limited to break-even energy balance, the magnetic mirror endcaps consumed power, but much less than that produced in a solenoid of sufficient length.

A new version, officially MFTF-B, started construction in 1977 and was completed in 1986 on the very day the project was canceled. Operation of MFTF-B was demonstrated by powering the superconducting magnets, at the time the world's largest, but no experiments were performed. Rollbacks in fusion research funding dramatically reduced funding levels across the entire field.

== Legacy ==
Parts of the MFTF have since been re-used on newer fusion experiments, one of which won a recycling award. In 2021, the project was cited as a case study of the hypothetical demon of Bureaucratic Chaos, which "blocks good things from happening" at the United States Department of Energy. Its fate was reminiscent of the Superconducting Super Collider and the National Compact Stellarator Experiment, both of which were also canceled.
