= Mikhail Ioffe =

Soviet physicist (1917–1996)

- Born: 2 September 1917; Samara, Russian Empire
- Died: 14 July 1996 (aged 78); Germany
- Education: Leningrad University
- Known for: Plasma, magnetic mirror
- Awards: Atoms for Peace Award
- Scientific career
- Fields: Physicist
- Workplaces: Ioffe Institute, Kurchatov Institute

Mikhail Solomonovich Ioffe (Russian: Михаил Соломонович Иоффе; 2 September 1917 – 14 July 1996) was a Soviet physicist best known for his work on magnetic mirror fusion devices, and especially his 1961 experimental device that demonstrated gross plasma stability was possible in a properly arranged magnetic field. His concept is known today as "Ioffe bars". Viewed with disfavour by the Soviet establishment for his cordial ties with his counterparts in the west, he was forbidden from leaving the Soviet Union until the dissolution of the Soviet Union. He subsequently received numerous international awards.

== Life ==
Ioffe was born on 2 September 1917 in Samara. He studied physics at Leningrad University and graduated in 1940 with a diploma, roughly similar to a master's degree. He served in the Red Army from 1941 to 1946. On leaving the Army, Ioffe became a staff member of the Physico-Technical Institute of Leningrad. In 1948 he moved to the Kurchatov Institute in Moscow, at that time known simply as "Laboratory No. 2", where he spent the rest of his working life. He gained his candidate's degree (PhD) in 1953 and Doctor of Science degree in 1971.

His work was mostly concerned with the properties of plasma in the field of nuclear fusion. In 1956 he was promoted to lead a small group studying the problem of micro-instabilities in plasma, a previously unknown issue that was causing significant problems in existing reactor designs. In particular, a type of plasma instability known as the flute instability was causing problems in the magnetic mirror design. Basic analysis carried out in both the Soviet Union and the US independently came to the same conclusion; any area where the magnetic field was convex with the plasma on the inside of the curve would cause the plasma to be ejected from the reactor.

Ioffe's team came up with a new arrangement of fields for the mirror, today known as the "minimum-B" or "magnetic well" configuration. By adding additional magnets to the mirror, the internal fields were modified so that the plasma sat within an area that was convex everywhere. Ioffe led the construction of a device to test this theory, adding six current conducting bars to a conventional mirror to modify the internal field. Testing the performance was simple, with back-to-back tests running the bars with or without current; the former demonstrated a 35-fold improvement in confinement time. The results of this device were presented in 1961 at the Conference on Fusion Research in Salzburg, Austria, where they were the highlight of the show.

The US mirror team also attended the show and presented data showing no sign of the instabilities even though they were not using the magnetic well configuration. This was something of a mystery until Lev Artsimovich asked a question about whether one of the key measurement devices had been calibrated to account for a well known delay in its output. The mystery was solved; accounting for this delay demonstrated that the US mirrors were completely unstable as Ioffe's work suggested.

Mirrors were not the only target of Ioffe's work on instability, he also solved a longstanding mystery of anomalous transport (rapid leakage) in the magnetic cusp concept and developed significant theory on magneto-electrostatic confinement which led to the later tandem mirror concept.

Throughout his career, Ioffe received many honours from the Soviet government. However, he was viewed with suspicion by the same government due to his cordial ties with his counterparts in the west. In 1969 he was forced to decline the Atoms for Peace Award. He was only able to visit the US in 1993 to attend the American Physical Society's plasma physics meeting.

== Bibliography ==
- Berk, Herbert; Fowler, T. Kenneth; Ryutov, Dimitri (February 1997). "Mikhail S. Ioffe". Physics Today. 50 (2): 87. doi:10.1063/1.2806536.
- Bromberg, Joan Lisa (1982). Fusion: Science, Politics, and the Invention of a New Energy Source. MIT Press. ISBN 0262021803.
