= Resistive ballooning mode =

The resistive ballooning mode (RBM) is an instability occurring in magnetized plasmas, particularly in magnetic confinement devices such as tokamaks, when the pressure gradient is opposite to the effective gravity created by a magnetic field.

== Linear growth rate ==
The linear growth rate $\gamma$ of the RBM instability is given as

$$\gamma^2 = -\vec{g_{eff}}\cdot\frac{\nabla p}{p}$$

where $|\nabla p|\sim \frac{p}{L_p}$ is the pressure gradient $g_{eff}=c_s^2|\frac{\nabla B}{B}|\sim 1/R_0$ is the effective gravity produced by a non-homogeneous magnetic field, R_{0} is the major radius of the device, L_{p} is a characteristic length of the pressure gradient, and c_{s} is the plasma sound speed.

== Similarity with the Rayleigh–Taylor instability ==
The RBM instability is similar to the Rayleigh–Taylor instability (RT), with Earth gravity $\vec g$ replaced by the effective gravity $\vec g_{eff}$, except that for the RT instability, $\vec g$ acts on the mass density $\rho$ of the fluid, whereas for the RBM instability, $\vec g_{eff}$ acts on the pressure $p$ of the plasma.
