= Lawrence Lidsky =

American physicist (1935–2002)

- Born: October 15, 1935; Brooklyn, New York, United States
- Died: March 1, 2002 (aged 66); Newton, Massachusetts, United States
- Education: Cornell University, MIT
- Occupation: professor of nuclear engineering
- Employer: Massachusetts Institute of Technology (MIT)
- Known for: advocate for safer nuclear fission reactor designs
- Notable work: founding editor of the Journal of Fusion Energy, The Trouble With Fusion.

Lawrence Mark Lidsky (1935–2002) was a professor of nuclear engineering at the Massachusetts Institute of Technology (MIT).

Lidsky was born in Brooklyn, New York, on October 15, 1935. He did his undergraduate studies at Cornell University, graduating in 1958, and earned a doctorate in nuclear engineering from MIT in 1962 with a thesis entitled "Plasma Generation and Acceleration", after which he joined the MIT faculty.

Lidsky was the advisor to more than 80 graduate students and the founding editor of the Journal of Fusion Energy. In 1983, as assistant director for the MIT Plasma Fusion Center, Lidsky wrote an influential article about the difficulties of making a working nuclear fusion power plant. The ensuing reduction in federal funding for fusion research led him to resign from the center, and caused him to be "drummed out" of the nuclear fusion research community.

Because of his concerns with the viability of fusion power, he instead became by 1989 an advocate for safer nuclear fission reactor designs. In 1999 he was named a fellow of the American Association for the Advancement of Science "for outstanding contributions to both nuclear fission and fusion in education, research, system design and analysis, technical publications and federal policy".

He died March 1, 2002, in Newton, Massachusetts, after struggling with cancer for many years.

== Selected publications ==
- Lidsky, L. M. (1983). The Trouble With Fusion. Technology Review, 86(7), 32–44.
