= T. Kenneth Fowler =

American physicist (born 1931)

Thomas Kenneth Fowler
- Born: March 1931; Thomaston, Georgia, U.S.
- Education: Vanderbilt University (B.A. 1953, M.A. 1955); University of Wisconsin–Madison (Ph.D. 1957)
- Known for: Plasma physics; magnetic nuclear fusion; The Fusion Quest
- Awards: Berkeley Citation; Fusion Power Associates Distinguished Career Award
- Scientific career
- Fields: Plasma physics; nuclear fusion
- Workplaces: Oak Ridge National Laboratory; General Atomics; Lawrence Livermore National Laboratory; University of California, Berkeley

Thomas Kenneth Fowler (born March 1931) is an American physicist. He is known for his work in plasma physics and magnetic nuclear fusion. He was a professor of nuclear engineering at the University of California, Berkeley.

== Life and career ==
Fowler studied at Vanderbilt University with a bachelor's degree in 1953 and a master's degree in 1955. He received his doctorate in theoretical physics at the University of Wisconsin in 1957

He was at the Oak Ridge National Laboratory from 1957 to 1965 and then at General Atomics from 1965 to 1967. In 1967 he moved to the Lawrence Livermore National Laboratory as head of the Plasma Theory Group and Plasma Physics. From 1970 to 1987 he was Associate Director for Controlled Nuclear Fusion of the Laboratory.

Between 1988 and 1994, he was head of the Department of Nuclear Engineering in Berkeley and was involved in the establishment of the university's multidisciplinary Center for toxic and radioactive waste. From 1995 he was Professor Emeritus in Berkeley. In 1997, he published The Fusion Quest.

In the 2000s, he worked on spheromak experiments fusion at Livermore. From 1998 to 2001 and 2003 to 2005, he was a member of the Review Panel of the Public Interest Energy Research Program (PIER) of California.

Fowler is a member of the National Academy of Sciences and a fellow of the American Physical Society. In 1995 he received the Berkeley Citation and Fusion Power Associates Distinguished Career Award.
