= Robert L. Hirsch =

American physicist

Robert L. Hirsch is an American physicist who has been involved in energy issues from the late 1960s. Through the 1970s he directed the U.S. fusion energy program at a variety of government positions as responsibility for the project moved from the Atomic Energy Commission to the Energy Research and Development Administration and finally to the Department of Energy. After that time he was a senior energy program adviser for Science Applications International Corporation and is a Senior Energy Advisor at MISI and a consultant in energy, technology, and management.

His primary experience is in research, development, and commercial applications. He has managed technology programs in oil and natural gas exploration and petroleum refining, synthetic fuels, fusion, fission, renewables, defense technologies, chemical analysis, and basic research, for example the Farnsworth-Hirsch fusor.

== Professional experience ==
=== Farnsworth ===
After graduation with a masters in mechanical engineering from the University of Michigan, Hirsch took a job at Atomics International and continued taking courses at ULCA. A course on "Foundations of Future Electronics" briefly touched on the topic of fusion, then only a year since declassification. Hirsch was hooked. He applied to the Atomic Energy Commission (AEC) for a fellowship to take a PhD in physics, which he was awarded in 1960. He entered the University of Illinois at Urbana-Champaign's recently-created nuclear engineering course and was awarded the school's first PhD in the topic in 1964.

After completing his PhD, Hirsch took a job at Farnsworth Labs, where Philo Farnsworth was developing a new type of fusion energy system, the fusor. Farnsworth was not interested in plasma physics, he wanted to build an actual working machine. Hirsch later summarized his attitude as "Don't play around with idealized systems any longer than you absolutely have to. Get to work on the real problems as fast as you can." This attitude had a long-lasting impact on Hirsch's thinking. Following Farnsworth's lead, the two began to experiment with a real fusion fuel of deuterium and tritium (D-T) in their tabletop experiments, while everyone else was still using cheaper test gasses like hydrogen. They were awarded with copious numbers of fusion neutrons, far more than any other device of the era.

In late 1966, Farnsworth's health began to fail, and with it, International Telephone and Telegraph's funding. Hirsch was tasked with writing a proposal to the AEC for further funding under their fusion development program. The proposal took almost a year to prepare and ultimately ended on the desk of the director of the AEC's fusion division, Amasa Bishop. Bishop ultimately rejected the proposal, but was impressed by the effort. After it was rejected, Hirsch concluded that the days of fusion research at Farnsworth were ending, and asked Bishop for a job. He was hired as a staff physicist in 1968.

=== Tokamak ===
Hirsch started at the AEC during a period of time known as "the doldrums". After early machines in the 1950s suggested that fusion was a relatively simple matter, larger machines built during the later 1950s universally failed as the fuel was found to leak from them at furious rates. This was not entirely unexpected; during World War II experiments during the Manhattan Project suggested such leakage was common and led to the Bohm diffusion rule. If true, a practical fusion machine was likely impossible. Most researchers concluded that the Bohm limit was not fundamental and simply a side-effect of the particular machines in question. But by the 1960s, with no improvements in sight, even Lyman Spitzer, one of fusion's greatest proponents, eventually concluded Bohm diffusion was a law.

But by 1969 there were signs things were not so hopeless. In 1965 during an international meeting on fusion in the UK, Soviet researchers presented preliminary data from a new style of machine known as the tokamak that they suggested was beating the Bohm limit. This was dismissed out of hand by the other teams at the meeting. Then, in 1968, a US machine known as the multipole built at General Atomics also clearly beat the limit, by about 20 times. At the next international fusion meeting in the summer of 1968, the Soviets presented three more years of data from their T-3 tokamak that showed it beating Bohm by 50 times and producing temperatures about 100 times that of other machines.

Once again the Soviet results were met with skepticism, but this time Lev Artsimovich was ready. During this period the UK fusion teams had been developing a new diagnostic technique using lasers that Artsimovich had already publicly called "brilliant". He invited the team to bring the system to Russia, to the heart of their bomb-making labs, to make their own measurements. The team, "the Culham Five" made a confidential call to the AEC in the summer of 1969: the machine worked, it was even better than the Soviet measurements.

When the results were made known to the US labs, Hirsch was upset to find considerable pushback. In particular, Harold Furth of the Princeton Plasma Physics Laboratory continued to make a string of complaints about the results to the point of raising Hirsch's ire. Furth's boss, Mel Gottlieb, eventually convinced him to convert their Model C stellarator to a tokamak, even if just to prove the Soviets wrong. It didn't; the newly rechristened Symmetric Tokamak proved the results correct once again. By October 1969, Bishop had approved five new tokamak projects.

=== Directorship ===
Bishop had indicated he would be leaving the AEC even before Hirsch started. As this date grew closer and Hirsch was the obvious choice to replace him, the two got in an argument about funding. When two labs applied for funding to build identical machines, the spherator, Bishop initially funded only one. Hirsch later learned that the second lab went ahead and began construction as well. Hirsch demanded that Bishop cancel the project and rein in the labs, and when he refused, went over his head in the AEC, to no avail. When Bishop stepped down in 1970 he suggested Hirsch not be given the position, which was instead given to Roy Gould from Caltech.

Gould was also beholden to the labs, but was more willing to allow Hirsch to take the lead. In 1971, it was Hirsch who presented the division's latest updates to Congress and made the public declaration that if increased funding were available, a commercial demonstration plant could be operational in 1995. Through these years, Hirsch became well known in Washington circles. Gould was in the position only for a short period, and quit to return to Caltech in the summer of 1972. He too suggested Hirsch not be given the position, but by this time Hirsch had made some powerful allies. Shortly after Gould announced his decision, Hirsch was called in by Spottford English, assistant to James Schlesinger, director of the AEC, and told that English would be putting in Hirsch's name for the position. After a series of interviews ending with Schlesinger, Hirsch took over the directorship of the fusion division in 1972. His deputy was Robert Bussard.

Around the same time, a series of changes in Washington was taking place. Schlesinger was soon replaced by Dixy Lee Ray who was highly supportive of the fusion program. Then, in June 1973, Richard Nixon announced the AEC's alternative energy budget would be dramatically increased and left to Ray to decide how to spend. Between 1972 and 1977, the fusion budget increased from $32 million to $112 million.

=== Burning plasma effort ===
In the chair position, Hirsch quickly moved to redirect the entire program to the goal of producing a machine that would reach the goal of breakeven, or Q=1. Doing so would be a tangible advance that could convince Congress to continue funding the program, although to do so the reactor would have to run on D-T fuel, which would complicate matters. At the same time, researchers at Oak Ridge National Laboratory had successfully implemented neutral beam injection as a method of heating a plasma, something that would be needed for a tokamak as it does not self-heat its plasma to fusion relevant temperatures. Hirsch decided to announce this as a "major breakthrough" and use it as an argument for a major tokamak development program.

The labs were highly sceptical of the breakeven effort and considered it to be a publicity stunt. The only lab that seemed interested in building a large machine, a stepping-stone to a burning machine, was Oak Ridge, who otherwise had no major future programs planned. As they expressed interest, the Princeton team quickly acquiesced and also introduced their version of a larger machine. After Oak Ridge flubbed several reviews and their final plan was much more expensive, Princeton's design won the contest in 1974. The new machine became the Tokamak Fusion Test Reactor.

In 1975, Ray split the AEC in two; one half became the Nuclear Regulatory Commission to handle licensing and certification of nuclear power plants, while the rest became the Energy Research and Development Administration, or ERDA, including energy research and ongoing nuclear weapon development. In April 1976, President Ford promoted Hirsch to direct the energy development division within ERDA. This removed him from direct control over the fusion program, which was handed to his assistant, Ed Kinter.

Soon after, President Carter took office and the new administration began cutting the fusion budget with an eye to stretching it out over time. Carter put Schlesinger back in the directorship, and when Hirsch met with him he was told they would find a position for him if he wanted. However, upset by the treatment of other officials by the incoming administration, he instead decided to accept an offer from Exxon, and resigned from ERDA in 1977.

=== Later ===
Hirsch has served on numerous advisory committees related to energy development, and he is the principal author of the report Peaking of World Oil Production: Impacts, Mitigation, and Risk Management, which was written for the United States Department of Energy.

His previous management positions include:

- Senior Energy Program Advisor, SAIC (World oil production)
- Senior Energy Analyst, RAND (Various energy studies)
- Vice President of the Electric Power Research Institute (EPRI).
- Vice President and Manager of Research and Technical Services for Atlantic Richfield Co. (ARCO) (Oil and gas exploration and production).
- Founder and CEO of APTI, a roughly $50 million/year company now owned by BAE Systems. (Commercial & Defense Department technologies).
- Manager of Exxon’s synthetic fuels research laboratory.
- Manager of Petroleum Exploratory Research at Exxon. (Refining R & D).

Hirsch has served as a consultant and on advisory committees for government and industry. He is past Chairman of the Board on Energy and Environmental Systems of the National Research Council, the operating arm of the National Academies, has served on a number of National Research Council committees, and is a National Associate of the National Academies. In recent years, he has focused on problems associated with the peaking of world conventional oil production and its mitigation.

== Energy policy ==
In 2008, Hirsch stated that declines in world oil supply caused proportionate declines in world GDP. His suggested framework for mitigation planning included:

"(1) a Best Case where maximum world oil production is followed by a multi-year plateau before the onset of a monotonic decline rate of 2–5% per year; (2) A Middling Case, where world oil production reaches a maximum, after which it drops into a long-term, 2–5% monotonic annual decline; and finally (3) a Worst Case, where the sharp peak of the Middling Case is degraded by oil exporter withholding, leading to world oil shortages growing potentially more rapidly than 2–5% per year, creating the most dire world economic impacts."

== Awards ==
Hirsch was awarded the M. King Hubbert award in 2009 by the ASPO-USA.

== Publications ==
Hirsch holds 14 patents and has over 50 publications in the energy field.

- Hirsch, Robert L. (February 27, 1979). "Method of mounting a fuel pellet in a laser-excited fusion reactor". US Patent 4,142,088.
- Hirsch, Robert L.; et al. (November 6, 1990). "Coal seam discontinuity sensor and method for coal mining apparatus". US Patent 4,968,098.
- Hirsch, Robert (March 1, 1996). "The Energy Plateau". Public Utilities Reports, Inc. Archived from the original on March 15, 2006.
- Hirsch, Robert L.; et al. (February 2005). "Peaking of world oil production: impacts, mitigation, & risk management". US Dept. Energy/National Energy Technology Lab.: 91.
- Hirsch, Robert L.; Bezdek, Roger H.; Wendling, Robert M.; et al. (November 28, 2005). "Peaking of world oil production: impacts, mitigation, & risk management". AIChE Journal. 52 (1): 2–8. doi:10.1002/aic.10747.
- Hirsch, Robert L.; et al. (2005). "Peaking of world oil production: impacts, mitigation, & risk management". US Dept. Energy/National Energy Technology Lab.
- Hirsch, Robert L. (October 2005). "The Inevitable Peaking of World Oil Production". Atlantic Council of the United States, Bulletin. XVI (3).
- Hirsch, Robert L.; Bezdek, Roger H.; Wendling, Robert M. (February 5, 2007). "Peaking of world oil production: recent Forecasts". US Department of Energy/National Energy Technology Lab. NETL-2007/1263.. See the Hirsch report
- Hirsch, Robert L. (February 2008). "Mitigation of maximum world oil production: Shortage scenarios". Energy Policy. 36 (2): 881–889. doi:10.1016/j.enpol.2007.11.009.
- Höök, Mikael; Hirsch, Robert L.; Aleklett, Kjell (June 2009). "Giant oil field decline rates and their influence on world oil production". Energy Policy. 37 (6): 2262–2272. doi:10.1016/j.enpol.2009.02.020.
- Hirsch, Robert L., Roger H. Bezdek, Robert M. Wendling The Impending World Energy Mess: What It Is and What It Means to You, Apogee Prime, 2010.

== See also ==
- Hirsch report
