= GLAST (tokamak) =

The GLAss Spherical Tokamak (or GLAST) is a name given to a set of small spherical tokamaks (i.e. magnetic confinement fusion reactors) located in Islamabad, Pakistan. They were developed by the Pakistan Atomic Energy Commission (PAEC) as part of the National Tokamak Fusion Program (NTFP) in 2008 and are primarily used for teaching and training purposes.

== GLAST-I & GLAST-II ==
GLAST-I & GLAST-II
- Device type: Spherical tokamak
- Location: Islamabad, Pakistan
- Affiliation: Pakistan Atomic Energy Commission

Technical specifications
- Major radius: 15 cm (5.9 in)
- Minor radius: 9 cm (3.5 in)
- Magnetic field: 0.1–0.4 T (1,000–4,000 G)
- Heating power: 300–400 eV
- Discharge duration: 1.0 ms (pulsed)
- Plasma current: 5 kA

History
- Succeeded by: GLAST-III

The first two tokamaks developed were named GLAST-I and GLAST-II. Both devices have similar principles of operation and consist of an insulated vacuum vessel made of pyrex glass. However, the central tube of GLAST-I is made of steel, while that of GLAST-II is made of glass.

Studies were done in GLAST-II to identify the mechanism responsible for current generation during the start-up phase of tokamak discharge.

=== Diagnostics ===
Plasma diagnostics including Langmuir triple probes, emissive probes and Optical Emission Spectroscopy systems were developed to measure basic plasma parameters such as electron temperature, electron number density, floating potential and impurity content in the discharge. The triple probe is capable of recording instantaneous plasma characteristics. Plasma current is then enhanced up to 5 kA by applying a small vertical magnetic field that provides additional plasma heating and shaping. The evolution of electron cyclotron heating (ECH)-assisted pre-ionization and subsequent current formation phases in one shot are well envisioned by probe measurements. The probe data seem to correlate with microwave absorption and subsequent light emission. Intense fluctuations in the current formation phase advocate for efficient equilibrium and feedback control systems. Moreover, the emergence of some strong impurity nitrogen lines in the emission spectrum even after few shots propose crucial need for improvement in the base vacuum level. A noticeable change in the profile's shape of floating potential, electron temperature, ion saturation current (Isat) and light emission is observed with changing hydrogen fill pressure and vertical field. The main discharge has been supported by microwave pre-ionization in the presence of optimized resonant toroidal magnetic field (TF). While optimizing the magnetic field, theoretical and experimental results of the TF profile are compared using a combination of fast and slow capacitor banks. The magnetic field produced by poloidal field (PF) coils are compared with theoretically predicted values.

It is found that calculated results are in good agreement with experimental measurement. An economical microwave source of 2.45 ± 0.02 GHz is fabricated using a magnetron obtained from a household microwave oven. Pulsed-mode operation of the magnetron is achieved through certain necessary modifications in the circuit. The magnetic field is upgraded to enhance the microwave power, where an additional electromagnet is introduced around the magnetron cavity that confines the fast moving electrons. This modified microwave source is sufficient to achieve the breakdown in GLAST-II with improved plasma current of 5kA.

== GLAST-III ==
GLAST-III
- Device type: Spherical tokamak
- Location: Islamabad, Pakistan
- Affiliation: Pakistan Atomic Energy Commission

Technical specifications
- Major radius: 20 cm (7.9 in)
- Minor radius: 10 cm (3.9 in)
- Magnetic field: 0.2 T (2,000 G) (central); 0.1 T (1,000 G) (toroidal)
- Discharge duration: 1.2 ms (pulsed)
- Plasma current: 5 kA

History
- Preceded by: GLAST-I & GLAST-II

GLAST-III is an upgraded version of the GLAST-I and GLAST-II designs which features a larger vessel diameter and a larger central bore for the placement of diagnostic tools such as Rogowski coils and flux loops.

=== Diagnostics ===
GLAST-III retained most of the diagnostics used in GLAST-I and GLAST-II, but a newly developed spectroscopic system based on linear photodiode array was installed on the upgraded GLAST-III for spatial and temporal characterization of hydrogen discharge through light emission. The spectral range of each silicon photodiode is from 300 nm to 1100 nm with response time of 10 ns and active area of 5 mm^{2} (circular). The light from the plasma is collected through holes along 4 line-of-sight channels with spatial resolution of about 5 cm passing from entire poloidal cross section. The photodiode's signals located at position of 10 and 14 cm from inboard side show fluctuations in the central plasma region. Moreover, the sequence of plasma lighting shows that plasma instigates from the central resonant field region and then expands outwards. At lower pressure, outboard movement of the plasma is slower suggesting better plasma confinement. In addition to photodiode array, an optical spectrometer (Ocean Optics HR2000+) has been used to record the visible spectrum over the selected range (597–703 nm) with a spectral resolution of 0.15 nm. The studies have been conducted during initial phase of plasma formation for two different hydrogen gas fill pressures. The triple probe is used to get time-resolved information on plasma parameters in the edge region. The time evolution of whole discharge including microwave pre-ionization phase and current formation phase has been demonstrated by temporal profiles of light emission and plasma floating potential.
