= LDX =

LDX or ldx may refer to:

- Levitated Dipole Experiment, nuclear fusion energy generation experiment
- Lisdexamfetamine, stimulant prodrug
- Saint-Laurent-du-Maroni Airport, Saint-Laurent-du-Maroni, French Guiana (IATA:LDX)
- Long distance xerography, an early form of facsimile transmission invented by the Xerox corporation
