= OpenStar =

New Zealand nuclear fusion company

OpenStar Technologies Limited
- Industry: Fusion power
- Founded: 2021; 5 years ago
- Founder: Ratu Mataira
- Headquarters: Wellington, New Zealand
- Number of employees: 55 (2025)
- Website: openstar.tech

OpenStar Technologies is a company based in Wellington, New Zealand, that is developing a nuclear fusion power reactor. It aims to build a series of devices that lead to a model able to supply electricity to the grid by the 2030s.

== History ==
The founder and CEO of OpenStar is Ratu Mataira, who has completed a Doctor of Philosophy (PhD) at the Robinson Research Institute, of Victoria University of Wellington. The institute focuses on superconductors. After Mataira first learned of the levitated dipole concept for fusion reactors in 2020, which the US government defunded in 2011, Mataira founded the company in 2021. According to 1News, OpenStar is the first New Zealand company to attempt to develop a nuclear fusion reactor.

By 2024, the company had raised a total of NZ$20 million. In 2024 Mataira estimated that the company would require between $500 million and $1 billion to successfully develop a fusion reactor. He has suggested that the pharmaceutical industry might be interested in OpenStar as the company could produce isotopes required by the pharmaceutical industry that are traditionally made using nuclear fission.

In November 2024, the company achieved the creation of plasma, which lasted for 20 seconds at 300,000 °C (540,000 °F). Temperatures in the hundreds of millions of degrees are required for fusion to occur. In February 2026 the New Zealand Government lent OpenStar $35 million through the Regional Development Fund. The company says that it will use this money to build a new research facility.

As of June 2025, OpenStar has 55 employees.

== Technology ==
OpenStar is developing a levitated dipole reactor, which uses a levitating superconducting toroidal battery-powered magnet that is placed and operates inside a vacuum chamber of cylindrical form modified with domed ends (a capsule or spherocylinder). Their first machine is named Marsden, after the English-New Zealand physicist Ernest Marsden, and its first magnet inside is named Junior. The vacuum chamber (Marsden) diameter is about 5 metres (16 ft); the magnet (Junior) diameter is about 1 metre (3.3 ft). In most magnetic confinement fusion reactor designs, such as a tokamak, the magnets are placed outside of the vacuum chamber. According to Mataira, "The core engineering challenge is how do you make a magnet that's surrounded by plasma operate for long enough to be useful".

The firm's reactors will use the hydrogen isotopes deuterium, which has one neutron, and tritium, which has two neutrons.

== See also ==
- List of nuclear fusion companies
