= Levitated Dipole Experiment =

Fusion power experiment

LDX
Levitated Dipole Experiment
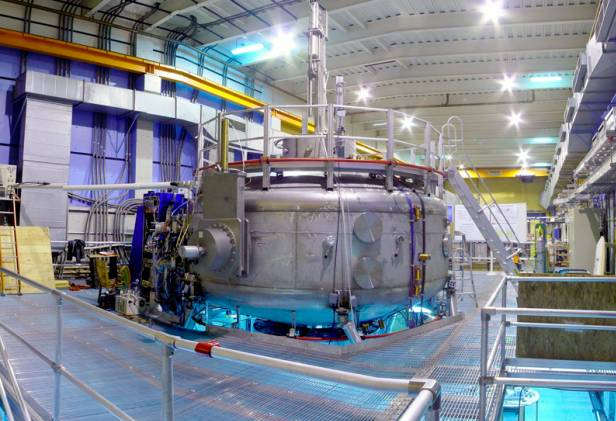
- A picture of the LDX chamber on 25 Jan 2010
- Device type: Levitated dipole
- Location: Cambridge, Massachusetts, United States
- Affiliation: MIT Plasma Science and Fusion Center, Columbia University

Technical specifications
- Major radius: 0.34 m (1 ft 1 in)

History
- Year(s) of operation: 2004–2011
- Related devices: Collisionless Terrella Experiment (CTX)

Links
- Website: The Levitated Dipole eXperiment website

The Levitated Dipole Experiment (LDX) was an experiment investigating the generation of fusion power using the concept of a levitated dipole. The device was the first of its kind to test the levitated dipole concept and was funded by the US Department of Energy. The machine was also part of a collaboration between the MIT Plasma Science and Fusion Center and Columbia University, where another (non-levitated) dipole experiment, the Collisionless Terrella Experiment (CTX), was located.

LDX ceased operations in November 2011, when its funding from the Department of Energy ended as resources were being diverted to tokamak research.

== Concept and development ==
The concept of the levitated dipole as a fusion reactor was first theorized by Akira Hasegawa in 1987. The concept was later proposed as an experiment by Jay Kesner of MIT and Michael Mauel of Columbia University in 1997. The pair assembled a team and raised money to build the machine. They achieved first plasma on Friday, August 13, 2004, at 12:53 PM. First plasma was done by (1) successfully levitating the dipole magnet and (2) RF heating the plasma. The LDX team has since successfully conducted several levitation tests, including a 40-minute suspension of the superconducting coil on February 9, 2007. Shortly after, the coil was damaged in a control test in February 2007 and replaced in May 2007. The replacement coil was inferior, a copper wound electromagnet, that was also water cooled. Scientific results, including the observation of an inward turbulent pinch, were reported in Nature Physics.

== Machine description ==
=== Dipole ===
This experiment needed a special free-floating electromagnet, which created the unique "toilet-bowl" magnetic field. The magnetic field was originally made of three coils. Each coil contained a 19-strand niobium-tin Rutherford cable (common in low-temperature superconducting magnets). These looped around inside an inconel structure; creating a magnet that looked like an oversized donut. The donut was charged using induction. Once charged, it generated a magnetic field for roughly an 8-hour period. Overall, the ring weighed 560 kilograms and levitated 1.6 meters above a superconducting ring. The ring produced a 5.7 T peak field. This superconductor was encased inside a liquid helium cryostat, which kept the electromagnet below 10 kelvins. This design is similar to the D20 dipole experiment at Berkeley and the RT-1 experiment at the University of Tokyo.

=== Chamber ===
The dipole was suspended inside a "squashed-pumpkin"-shaped vacuum chamber, which was about 5.2 meters in diameter and ~3 meters high. At the base of the chamber was a charging coil. This coil is used to charge the dipole, using induction. Next, the dipole is raised into the center of the chamber using a launcher-rather system running through the bore of the dipole magnet. A copper magnet fixed on top of the chamber produced a magnetic field which attracted the floating dipole magnet. This external field would interact with the dipole field, suspending the dipole. The magnetic field produce by the floating dipole magnet is used to confine the plasma. The plasma forms around the dipole and inside the chamber. The plasma is formed by heating a low pressure gas using a radio frequency, essentially microwaving the plasma in a ~15-kilowatt field.

=== Diagnostics ===
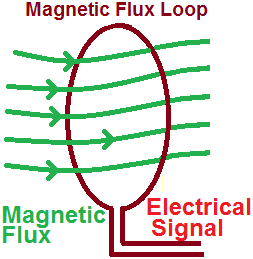
A flux loop is a loop of wire. The magnetic field passes through the wire loop. As the field varied inside the loop, it generated a current. This was measured and from the signal the magnetic flux was measured.

The machine was monitored using diagnostics fairly standard to all of fusion. These included:

1. A flux loop. This is a loop of wire. The magnetic field passes through the wire loop. As the field varied inside the loop, it generated a current. This was measured and from the signal the magnetic flux was measured.
2. An X-ray detector. This diagnostic measured the X-rays emitted. From this, the plasmas' temperature was found. There were four of these inside the machine, each measuring along a cord (or line out) inside the machine. This detector was good for measuring electrons, typically around 100 electron-volts. All plasma loses energy by emitting light. This covers the whole spectrum: visible, IR, UV, and X-rays. This occurs anytime a particle changes speed, for any reason. If the reason is deflection by a magnetic field, the radiation is Cyclotron radiation at low speeds and Synchrotron radiation at high speeds. If the reason is deflection by another particle, plasma radiates X-rays, known as Bremsstrahlung radiation.
3. An X-ray camera. This can read lower energy X-rays.
4. A conventional video camera
5. An emissive Langmuir probe. A Langmuir probe is a wire, stuck into a plasma, which absorbs the surrounding charged particles. You can vary the voltage on this wire. As the voltage changes, the charged particles absorbed change, making an IV curve. This can be read and used to measure the density and temperature of the nearby plasma.
6. A triple Langmuir probe
7. A dozen Langmuir probes grouped together

== Behavior ==
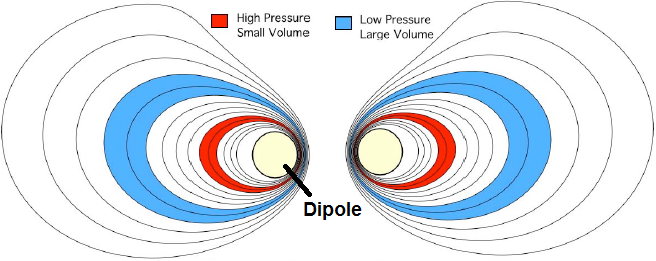
Bulk plasma behavior inside the LDX

The plasma is confined by the dipole magnetic field. Single particles corkscrew along the field lines of the dipole magnet at the cyclotron resonance frequency while completing poloidal orbits. The electron population was shown to have a peaked pressure and density profile as a result of the turbulent pinch phenomenon.

=== Modes of operation ===
There were two modes of operation observed:

1. Hot electron interchange: a lower density, mostly electron plasma, occurring when the dipole was operated in "supported" mode (not levitated).
2. A more conventional Magnetohydrodynamic mode.

These had been proposed by Nicholas Krall in the 1960s.

=== Tritium suppression ===
In the case of deuterium fusion (the cheapest and most straightforward fusion fuel) the geometry of the LDX has the unique advantage over other concepts. Deuterium fusion makes two products, that occur with near equal probability:

$$\ce{D + D -> T + ^1H}$$
$$\ce{D + D -> ^3He + n}$$

In this machine, the secondary tritium could be partially removed, a unique property of the dipole. Another fuel choice is tritium and deuterium. This reaction can be done at lower heats and pressures. But it has several drawbacks. First, tritium is far more expensive than deuterium. This is because tritium is rare. It has a short half-life making it hard to produce and store. It is also considered a hazardous material, increasing difficulties with storage and handling. Finally, tritium and deuterium produces fast neutrons which means any reactor burning it would require heavy radiation shielding for its magnets. As the floating dipole magnet cannot have services (such as cooling) connected from the outside world, this makes thermal management of the floating magnet much harder in a D-T machine.
