= Flux loop =

A flux loop is a loop of wire placed inside a plasma at a right angle. Changes in the field create a current in the loop, which may be interpreted to measure the properties of the plasma. Flux loops are key diagnostics in fusion power research.

== Theory ==
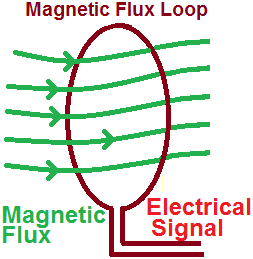
A very basic flux loop

A flux loop is a loop of wire. The magnetic field passes through the wire loop. As the field varies inside the loop, it generates a voltage by Faraday's law of induction, driving a current. This was measured and from the signal the magnetic flux was measured. The voltage induced is determined by:

$$\text{voltage(Time) }= \text{Number of Loops}* \text{Area} * \frac{d\ \text{Magnetic Field(time)}}{d\ \text{time}}$$

Typically, you need to integrate the signal over a period of time to get the magnetic field at that instant (not just the change in magnetic fields). This is normally done by adding an integrator circuit which will passively integrate the electrical signal.

$$\text{voltage} =\frac{\text{Number of Loops}*\text {Area} *\text{Magnetic Field}}{\text{resistance}*\text{capacitance}}$$

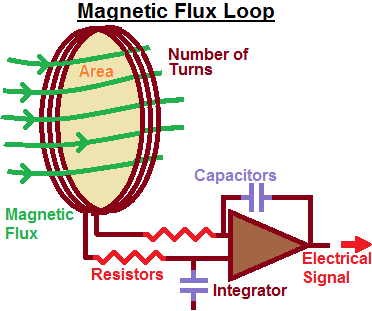
Flux Loop with Circuit Integrator

== Common Uses ==
The flux loop is common on tokamaks, magnetic mirrors, Field-reversed configurations, the Levitated dipole experiment and the polywell. In tokamaks a set of loops is used, and these are spaced slightly off-center and non-concentrically. Placing the loops intentionally asymmetrically allows the users to find the magnetic field density at different points inside the tokamak. The distance between the loops was determined by shafranov, and is sometime called the "shafranov distance".
