= Levitated dipole =

Nuclear fusion reactor design concept

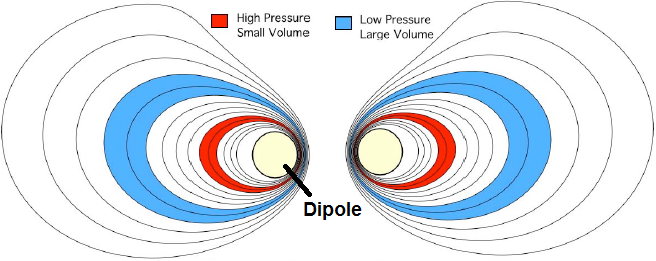
Plasma in the Levitating Dipole Experiment

A levitated dipole is a type of magnetic confinement nuclear fusion power reactor design usually using a superconducting torus that is magnetically levitated inside a reactor chamber. The name refers to the magnetic dipole that forms within the reaction chamber, similar to Earth's magnetosphere. It is claimed that such an apparatus could contain plasma more efficiently than other fusion reactor designs. The concept of using one as a fusion reactor was introduced by Akira Hasegawa in 1987.

== Concept ==
The Earth's magnetic field is generated by the circulation of charges in the Earth's molten core. The resulting magnetic dipole field forms a shape with magnetic field lines passing through the Earth's center, reaching the surface near the poles and extending far into space above the equator. Charged particles entering the field tend to follow the lines of force, moving north or south. As they reach the polar regions, the magnetic lines cluster. This strengthening field can cause particles below a certain energy threshold to reflect, and begin travelling in the opposite direction. Such particles bounce back and forth between the poles until they collide with other particles. Particles with greater energy continue towards the Earth, impacting the atmosphere and causing auroras.

=== Magnetic mirror ===
This concept is used in the magnetic mirror approach to fusion energy. The mirror uses a solenoid to confine the plasma in the center of a cylinder, and then magnets at both ends force the magnetic lines closer together to create reflecting areas. The mirror ultimately proved to be "leaky"; the fuel refused to properly reflect from the ends as density and energy increased. Unfortunately, particles with the most energy (those most likely to undergo fusion) preferentially escaped. Research into large mirror machines ended in the 1980s.

=== Toroidal mirror ===
The levitated dipole can be considered a toroidal mirror, much more similar to the Earth's field than the linear system in a traditional mirror. The confinement area is the toroidal area around the outside of the central magnet, similar to the area around the Earth's equator. Particles in this area that move out experience increasing magnetic density and tend to move back towards the center, which tends to stabilize the system. Particles with higher energy, those that would escape a traditional mirror, instead follow the field lines through the hollow center of the magnet, recirculating back into the equatorial area.

This makes the levitated dipole unique when compared with other magnetic confinement fusion machines. In those experiments, small fluctuations can cause significant energy loss. By contrast, in a dipolar magnetic field, fluctuations tend to compress the plasma, without energy loss. This compression effect was first noticed by Akira Hasegawa (of the Hasegawa–Mima equation) after participating in the Voyager 2 encounter with Uranus.

== Examples ==
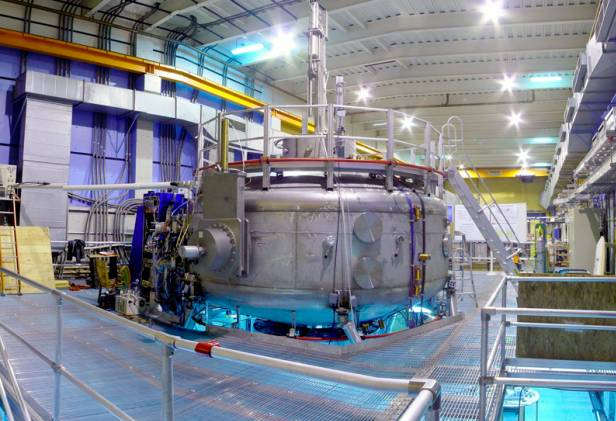
The Levitated Dipole Experiment (LDX)

The concept of the levitated dipole was first realized when Jay Kesner of Massachusetts Institute of Technology (MIT) and Michael Mauel of Columbia University made a joint proposal to test the concept in 1997. This led to the development of two experiments: the Levitated Dipole Experiment (LDX) at MIT and the Collisionless Terrella Experiment (CTX) at Columbia.

As of 2026, at least two companies are pursuing magnetic confinement fusion reactors based on levitated dipole geometries, both fueled by deuterium–deuterium reactions, with tritium suppressed: OpenStar Technologies, in New Zealand, founded in 2021, uses magnetic levitation, and Deutelio, in Switzerland, founded in 2022, uses structural levitation.

In October 2024, OpenStar Technologies created a cloud of ionized helium contained by a dipole levitated by a permanent magnet. The plasma is managed using a central superconducting magnet. The magnet was precooled to about 30 K (−243.2 °C; −405.7 °F). The plasma pressure for a given magnetic field is 13 times higher in a dipole machine than in a tokamak. The potential fusion power is more than 150 times larger.
