= Alfvén =

Alfvén may refer to:

== People ==
- Hannes Alfvén (1908–1995), Swedish plasma physicist and Nobel Prize laureate
- Hugo Alfvén (1872–1960), Swedish composer, conductor, violinist, and painter
- Marie Triepcke Krøyer Alfvén (1867–1940), known as Marie Krøyer, Danish painter, wife of Hugo

== Other ==
- Alfvén wave, a type of magnetohydrodynamic wave, named after Hannes Alfvén
- 1778 Alfvén, an asteroid discovered in 1960, named after Hannes Alfvén
