= Plasma cosmology =

Non-standard model of the universe; emphasizes the role of ionized gases

Comparison of the evolution of the universe under Alfvén–Klein cosmology and the Big Bang theory.

Plasma cosmology is a non-standard cosmology whose central postulate is that the dynamics of ionized gases and plasmas play important, if not dominant, roles in the physics of the universe at interstellar and intergalactic scales. In contrast, the current observations and models of cosmologists and astrophysicists explain the formation, development, and evolution of large-scale structures as dominated by gravity (including its formulation in Albert Einstein's general theory of relativity).

The original form of the theory, Alfvén–Klein cosmology, was developed by Hannes Alfvén and Oskar Klein in the 1960s and 1970s, and holds that matter and antimatter exist in equal quantities at very large scales, that the universe is eternal rather than bounded in time by the Big Bang, and that the expansion of the observable universe is caused by annihilation between matter and antimatter rather than a mechanism like cosmic inflation.

Cosmologists and astrophysicists who have evaluated plasma cosmology reject it because it does not match the observations of astrophysical phenomena as well as the currently accepted Big Bang model. Very few papers supporting plasma cosmology have appeared in the literature since the mid-1990s.

The term plasma universe is sometimes used as a synonym for plasma cosmology, as an alternative description of the plasma in the universe. Plasma cosmology is distinct from pseudoscientific ideas collectively called the Electric Universe, though proponents of each are known to be sympathetic to each other. These pseudoscientific ideas vary widely but generally claim that electric currents flow into stars and power them like light bulbs, contradicting well-established scientific theories and observations showing that stars are powered by nuclear fusion.

== Alfvén–Klein cosmology ==
Hannes Alfvén suggested that scaling laboratory results can be extrapolated up to the scale of the universe. A scaling jump by a factor 10^{9} was required to extrapolate to the magnetosphere, a second jump to extrapolate to galactic conditions, and a third jump to extrapolate to the Hubble distance.

In the 1960s, the theory behind plasma cosmology was introduced by Alfvén, a plasma expert who won the 1970 Nobel Prize in Physics for his work on magnetohydrodynamics. He proposed the use of plasma scaling to extrapolate the results of laboratory experiments and plasma physics observations and scale them over many orders of magnitude up to the largest observable objects in the universe (see box). In 1971, Oskar Klein, a Swedish theoretical physicist, extended the earlier proposals and developed the Alfvén–Klein model of the universe, or "metagalaxy", an earlier term used to refer to the empirically accessible part of the universe, rather than the entire universe including parts beyond our particle horizon.

In this model, the universe is made up of equal amounts of matter and antimatter with the boundaries between the regions of matter and antimatter being delineated by cosmic electromagnetic fields formed by double layers, thin regions comprising two parallel layers with opposite electrical charge. Interaction between these boundary regions would generate radiation, and this would form the plasma. Alfvén introduced the term ambiplasma for a plasma made up of matter and antimatter and the double layers are thus formed of ambiplasma. According to Alfvén, such an ambiplasma would be relatively long-lived as the component particles and antiparticles would be too hot and too low-density to annihilate each other rapidly. The double layers will act to repel clouds of opposite type, but combine clouds of the same type, creating ever-larger regions of matter and antimatter. The idea of ambiplasma was developed further into the forms of heavy ambiplasma (protons-antiprotons) and light ambiplasma (electrons-positrons).

Alfvén–Klein cosmology was proposed in part to explain the observed baryon asymmetry in the universe, starting from an initial condition of exact symmetry between matter and antimatter. According to Alfvén and Klein, ambiplasma would naturally form pockets of matter and pockets of antimatter that would expand outwards as annihilation between matter and antimatter occurred in the double layer at the boundaries. They concluded that we must just happen to live in one of the pockets that was mostly baryons rather than antibaryons, explaining the baryon asymmetry. The pockets, or bubbles, of matter or antimatter would expand because of annihilations at the boundaries, which Alfvén considered as a possible explanation for the observed expansion of the universe, which would be merely a local phase of a much larger history. Alfvén postulated that the universe has always existed due to causality arguments and the rejection of ex nihilo models, such as the Big Bang, as a stealth form of creationism. The exploding double layer was also suggested by Alfvén as a possible mechanism for the generation of cosmic rays, X-ray bursts and gamma-ray bursts.

In 1993, theoretical cosmologist Jim Peebles criticized Alfvén–Klein cosmology, writing that "there is no way that the results can be consistent with the isotropy of the cosmic microwave background radiation and X-ray backgrounds". In his book he also showed that Alfvén's models do not predict Hubble's law, the abundance of light elements, or the existence of the cosmic microwave background. A further difficulty with the ambiplasma model is that matter–antimatter annihilation results in the production of high energy photons, which are not observed in the amounts predicted. While it is possible that the local "matter-dominated" cell is simply larger than the observable universe, this proposition does not lend itself to observational tests.

== Plasma cosmology and the study of galaxies ==
Hannes Alfvén from the 1960s to 1980s argued that plasma played an important if not dominant role in the universe. He argued that electromagnetic forces are far more important than gravity when acting on interplanetary and interstellar charged particles. He further hypothesized that they might promote the contraction of interstellar clouds and may even constitute the main mechanism for contraction, initiating star formation. The current standard view is that magnetic fields can hinder collapse, that large-scale Birkeland currents have not been observed, and that the length scale for charge neutrality is predicted to be far smaller than the relevant cosmological scales.

In the 1980s and 1990s, Alfvén and Anthony Peratt, a plasma physicist at Los Alamos National Laboratory, outlined a program they called the "plasma universe". In plasma universe proposals, various plasma physics phenomena were associated with astrophysical observations and were used to explain contemporary mysteries and problems outstanding in astrophysics in the 1980s and 1990s. In various venues, Peratt profiled what he characterized as an alternative viewpoint to the mainstream models applied in astrophysics and cosmology.

For example, Peratt proposed that the mainstream approach to galactic dynamics which relied on gravitational modeling of stars and gas in galaxies with the addition of dark matter was overlooking a possibly major contribution from plasma physics. He mentions laboratory experiments of Winston H. Bostick in the 1950s that created plasma discharges that looked like galaxies. Perrat conducted computer simulations of colliding plasma clouds that he reported also mimicked the shape of galaxies. Peratt proposed that galaxies formed due to plasma filaments joining in a z-pinch, the filaments starting 300,000 light years apart and carrying Birkeland currents of 10^{18} amperes. Peratt also reported simulations he did showing emerging jets of material from the central buffer region that he compared to quasars and active galactic nuclei occurring without supermassive black holes. Peratt proposed a sequence for galaxy evolution: "the transition of double radio galaxies to radioquasars to radioquiet QSO's to peculiar and Seyfert galaxies, finally ending in spiral galaxies". He also reported that flat galaxy rotation curves were simulated without dark matter. At the same time Eric Lerner, an independent plasma researcher and supporter of Peratt's ideas, proposed a plasma model for quasars based on a dense plasma focus.

== Comparison with mainstream astrophysics ==
Standard astronomical modeling and theories attempt to incorporate all known physics into descriptions and explanations of observed phenomena, with gravity playing a dominant role on the largest scales as well as in celestial mechanics and dynamics. To that end, both Keplerian orbits and Albert Einstein's General Theory of Relativity are generally used as the underlying frameworks for modeling astrophysical systems and structure formation, while high-energy astronomy and particle physics in cosmology additionally appeal to electromagnetic processes including plasma physics and radiative transfer to explain relatively small scale energetic processes observed in the x-rays and gamma rays. Due to overall charge neutrality, plasma physics does not provide for very long-range interactions in astrophysics even while much of the matter in the universe is plasma. (See astrophysical plasma for more.)

Proponents of plasma cosmology claim electrodynamics is as important as gravity in explaining the structure of the universe, and speculate that it provides an alternative explanation for the evolution of galaxies and the initial collapse of interstellar clouds. In particular plasma cosmology is claimed to provide an alternative explanation for the flat rotation curves of spiral galaxies and to do away with the need for dark matter in galaxies and with the need for supermassive black holes in galaxy centres to power quasars and active galactic nuclei. However, theoretical analysis shows that "many scenarios for the generation of seed magnetic fields, which rely on the survival and sustainability of currents at early times [of the universe are disfavored]", i.e. Birkeland currents of the magnitude needed (10^{18} amps over scales of megaparsecs) for galaxy formation do not exist. Additionally, many of the issues that were mysterious in the 1980s and 1990s, including discrepancies relating to the cosmic microwave background and the nature of quasars, have been solved with more evidence that, in detail, provides a distance and time scale for the universe.

Some of the places where plasma cosmology supporters are most at odds with standard explanations include the need for their models to have light element production without Big Bang nucleosynthesis, which, in the context of Alfvén–Klein cosmology, has been shown to produce excessive X-rays and gamma rays beyond that observed. Plasma cosmology proponents have made further proposals to explain light element abundances, but the attendant issues have not been fully addressed. In 1995 Eric Lerner published his alternative explanation for the cosmic microwave background radiation (CMBR). He argued that his model explained the fidelity of the CMB spectrum to that of a black body and the low level of anisotropies found, even while the level of isotropy at 1:10^{5} is not accounted for to that precision by any alternative models. Additionally, the sensitivity and resolution of the measurement of the CMB anisotropies was greatly advanced by WMAP and the Planck satellite and the statistics of the signal were so in line with the predictions of the Big Bang model, that the CMB has been heralded as a major confirmation of the Big Bang model to the detriment of alternatives. The acoustic peaks in the early universe are fit with high accuracy by the predictions of the Big Bang model, and, to date, there has never been an attempt to explain the detailed spectrum of the anisotropies within the framework of plasma cosmology or any other alternative cosmological model.
