= Dense plasma focus =

Ionized gas-generating "pinch" machine

A dense plasma focus (DPF) is a type of plasma generating system originally developed as a fusion power device, starting in the early 1960s. The system demonstrated scaling laws that suggested it would not be useful in the commercial power role, and since the 1980s it has been used mainly as a fusion teaching system, and as a source of neutrons and X-rays.

The original concept was developed in 1954 in the Soviet Union by N.V. Filippov, who noticed the effect while working on early pinch machines. A major research program on DPF was carried out in the USSR through the late 1950s, and continues to this day. A different version of the same basic concept was independently discovered in the US by J.W. Mather in the early 1960s. This version saw some development in the 1970s, and variations continue to be developed.

The basic design derives from the Z-pinch concept. Both the DPF and pinch use large electrical currents run through a gas to cause it to ionize into a plasma and then pinch down on itself to increase the density and temperature of the plasma. The DPF differs largely in form: most devices use two concentric cylinders and form the pinch at the end of the central cylinder. In contrast, Z-pinch systems generally use one cylinder, sometimes a torus, and pinch the plasma into the center.

The plasma focus is similar to the high-intensity plasma gun device (HIPGD, or simply plasma gun), which ejects plasma in the form of a plasmoid, without pinching it. A comprehensive review of the dense plasma focus and its diverse applications has been made by Krishnan in 2012.

== Pinch concept ==
Pinch-based devices are the earliest systems to be seriously developed for fusion research, starting with very small machines built in London in 1948. These normally took one of two forms; linear pinch machines are straight tubes with electrodes at both ends to apply current into the plasma, whereas toroidal pinch machines are doughnut-shaped devices with large magnets wrapped around them that supply current via magnetic induction.

In both types of machine, a large pulse of current is applied to a dilute gas inside a tube. This current initially ionizes the gas into a plasma. Once the ionization is complete, which occurs in microseconds, the plasma begins to conduct a current. Due to the Lorentz force, the current creates a magnetic field that causes the plasma to pinch itself down into a filament, similar to a lightning bolt. This process increases the density of the plasma very rapidly, raising its temperature.

Early devices quickly demonstrated problems with the stability of this process. As current begins to flow in a plasma, magnetic effects termed instabilities occur, of two forms: sausage and kink. These cause a plasma to become unstable and eventually hit the sides of the container. This causes two problems. Hot plasma can erode container surfaces. Further, as this occurs, the hot plasma can cause atoms of the container material, usually metal or glass, to spall off and enter the fuel. This cools the plasma rapidly. Unless the plasma can be made stable, this loss process makes fusion impossible.

In the mid-1950s, two possible solutions appeared. In the fast-pinch concept, a linear device causes the pinch so quickly that the plasma as a whole does not move, instead only the outermost layer begins to pinch, creating a shock wave that continues the pinch process after the current is removed. In the stabilized pinch concept, new magnetic fields are added that mix with the current's field and create a more stable configuration. In testing, neither of these systems worked, and the pinch route to fusion was largely abandoned by the early 1960s.

== DPF concept ==
During experiments on a linear pinch machine, Filippov noticed that certain arrangements of the electrodes and tube would cause the plasma to form into new shapes. This led to the DPF concept.

In a typical DPF machine, there are two concentric cylindrical electrodes. The inner one, often solid, is physically separated from the outer by an insulating disk at one end of the device. It is left open at the other end. The result is something like a drinking mug with a half sausage standing on its end in the middle of the mug.

When current is applied, it begins to arc at the path of least resistance, at the end near the insulator disk. This causes the gas in the area to rapidly ionize, and current begins to flow through it to the outer electrode. The current creates a magnetic field that begins to push the plasma down the tube towards the open end. It reaches the end in microseconds.

When the plasma reaches the open end, it continues moving for a short time, but the endpoints of the current sheet remain attached to the end of the cylinders. This causes the plasma sheet to bow out into a shape not unlike an umbrella or the cap of a mushroom.

At this point, further movement stops, and the continuing current instead begins to pinch the section near the central electrode. Eventually this causes the former ring-shaped area to compress down into a vertical post extending off the end of the inner electrode. In this volume, the density increases greatly. This is the focus.

The whole process proceeds at many times the speed of sound in the ambient gas. As the current sheath continues to move axially, the portion in contact with the anode slides across the face of the anode, axisymmetrically. When the imploding front of the shock wave coalesces onto the axis, a reflected shock front emanates from the axis until it meets the driving current sheath which then forms the axisymmetric boundary of the pinched, or focused, hot plasma column.

The dense plasma column (akin to the Z-pinch) rapidly pinches and undergoes instabilities and breaks up. The intense electromagnetic radiation and particle bursts, collectively referred to as multi-radiation occur during the dense plasma and breakup phases. These critical phases last typically tens of nanoseconds for a small (kJ, 100 kA) focus machine to around a microsecond for a large (MJ, several MA) focus machine.

The process, including axial and radial phases, may last, for the Mather DPF machine, a few microseconds (for a small focus) to 10 microseconds for a larger focus machine. A Filippov focus machine has a very short axial phase compared to a Mather focus.

== Applications ==
When operated using deuterium, intense bursts of X-rays and charged particles are emitted, as are nuclear fusion byproducts including neutrons. There is ongoing research that demonstrates potential applications as a soft X-ray source for next-generation microelectronics lithography, surface micromachining, pulsed X-ray and neutron source for medical diagnosis and therapy, security inspection, and material modification, among others.

For nuclear weapons applications, dense plasma focus devices can be used as an external neutron source. Other applications include simulation of nuclear explosions (for testing of the electronic equipment) and a short and intense neutron source useful for non-contact discovery or inspection of nuclear materials (uranium, plutonium).

== Characteristics ==
An important characteristic of the dense plasma focus is that the energy density of the focused plasma is practically a constant over the whole range of machines, from sub-kilojoule machines to megajoule machines, when these machines are tuned for optimal operation. This means that a small table-top-sized plasma focus machine produces essentially the same plasma characteristics (temperature and density) as the largest plasma focus. However, the larger machine will produce a larger volume of focused plasma with a corresponding longer lifetime, and more radiation yield.

Even the smallest plasma focus has essentially the same dynamic characteristics as larger machines, producing the same plasma characteristics and the same radiation products. This is due to the scalability of plasma phenomena.

See also plasmoid, the self-contained magnetic plasma ball that may be produced by a dense plasma focus.

== Design parameters ==
The plasma energy density being constant throughout the range of plasma focus devices, from small to big, is related to the value of a design parameter that needs to be kept at a certain value if a plasma focus is to operate efficiently.

The critical 'speed' design parameter for neutron-producing devices is $\frac{I}{a\sqrt{p}}$, where $I$ is the current, $a$ is the anode radius, and $p$ is the gas density or pressure.

For example, for neutron-optimised operation in deuterium the value of this critical parameter, experimentally observed over a range of machines from kilojoules to hundreds of kilojoules, is: 9 kA/(mm·Torr^{0.5}), or 780 kA/(m·Pa^{0.5}), with a remarkably small deviation of 10% over such a large range of sizes of machines.

Thus, given a peak current of 180 kA, an anode requires a radius of 10 mm, with a deuterium fill pressure of 4 Torr (530 Pa). The length of the anode must then be matched to the risetime of the capacitor current to allow an average axial transit speed of the current sheath of just over 50 mm/μs. Thus, a capacitor risetime of 3 μs requires a matched anode length of 160 mm.

The above example of peak current of 180 kA rising in 3 μs, anode radius and length of respectively 10 and 160 mm are close to the design parameters of the United Nations University/International Centre for Theoretical Physics Plasma Fusion Facility (UNU/ICTP PFF). This small table-top device was designed as a low-cost integrated experimental system for training and transfer to initiate/strengthen experimental plasma research in developing countries.

The square of the drive parameter is a measure of the plasma energy density.

In contrast, another proposed, so called energy density parameter ${28E \over a^3}$, where E is the energy stored in the capacitor bank and a is the anode radius, for neutron-optimised operation in deuterium the value of this critical parameter, experimentally observed over a range of machines from tens of joules to hundreds of kilojoules, is in the order of ${5 \cdot 10^{10}}$ J/m^{3}. For example, for a capacitor bank of 3kJ, the anode radius is in the order of 12mm. This parameter has a range of 3.6x10^9 to 7.6x10^11 for the machines surveyed by Soto. The wide range of this parameter is because it is a "storage energy density" which translates into plasma energy density with different efficiency depending on the widely differing performance of different machines. Thus to result in the necessary plasma energy density (which is found to be a near constant for optimized neutron production) requires widely differing initial storage density.

== Current research ==
A network of ten identical DPF machines operates in eight countries around the world. This network produces research papers on topics including machine optimization & diagnostics (soft X-rays, neutrons, electron and ion beams), applications (microlithography, micromachining, materials modification and fabrication, imaging & medical, astrophysical simulation) as well as modeling & computation. The network was organized by Sing Lee in 1986 and is coordinated by the Asian African Association for Plasma Training, AAAPT. A simulation package, the Lee Model, has been developed for this network but is applicable to all plasma focus devices. The code typically produces excellent agreement between computed and measured results, and is available for downloading as a Universal Plasma Focus Laboratory Facility. The Institute for Plasma Focus Studies IPFS was founded on 25 February 2008 to promote correct and innovative use of the Lee Model code and to encourage the application of plasma focus numerical experiments. IPFS research has already extended numerically derived neutron scaling laws to multi-megajoule experiments. These await verification. Numerical experiments with the code have also resulted in the compilation of a global scaling law indicating that the well-known neutron saturation effect is better correlated to a scaling deterioration mechanism. This is due to the increasing dominance of the axial phase dynamic resistance as capacitor bank impedance decreases with increasing bank energy (capacitance). In principle, the resistive saturation could be overcome by operating the pulse power system at a higher voltage.

The International Centre for Dense Magnetised Plasmas (ICDMP) in Warsaw Poland, operates several plasma focus machines for an international research and training programme. Among these machines is one with energy capacity of 1 MJ (PF-1000 device at Institute of Plasma Physics and Laser Microfusion) making it one of the largest plasma focus devices in the world.

In Argentina there is an Inter-institutional Program for Plasma Focus Research since 1996, coordinated by a National Laboratory of Dense Magnetized Plasmas (www.pladema.net) in Tandil, Buenos Aires. The Program also cooperates with the Chilean Nuclear Energy Commission, and networks the Argentine National Energy Commission, the Scientific Council of Buenos Aires, the University of Center, the University of Mar del Plata, The University of Rosario, and the Institute of Plasma Physics of the University of Buenos Aires. The program operates six Plasma Focus Devices, developing applications, in particular ultra-short tomography and substance detection by neutron pulsed interrogation. PLADEMA also contributed during the last decade with several mathematical models of Plasma Focus. The thermodynamic model was able to develop for the first time design maps combining geometrical and operational parameters, showing that there is always an optimum gun length and charging pressure which maximize the neutron emission. Currently there is a complete finite-elements code validated against numerous experiments, which can be used confidently as a design tool for Plasma Focus.

In Chile, at the Chilean Nuclear Energy Commission the plasma focus experiments have been extended to sub-kilojoules devices and the scales rules have been stretched up to region less than one joule. Their studies have contributes to know that is possible to scale the plasma focus in a wide range of energies and sizes keeping the same value of ion density, magnetic field, plasma sheath velocity, Alfvén speed and the quantity of energy per particle. Therefore, fusion reactions are even possible to be obtained in ultraminiature devices (driven by generators of 0.1J for example), as they are in the bigger devices (driven by generators of 1MJ). However, the stability of the plasma pinch highly depends on the size and energy of the device. A rich plasma phenomenology it has been observed in the table-top plasma focus devices developed at the Chilean Nuclear Energy Commission: filamentary structures, toroidal singularities, plasma bursts and plasma jets generations. Further, possible applications are explored using these kind of small plasma devices: development of portable generator as non-radioactive sources of neutrons and X-rays for field applications, pulsed radiation applied to biological studies, plasma focus as neutron source for nuclear fusion-fission hybrid reactors, and the use of plasma focus devices as plasma accelerators for studies of materials under intense fusion-relevant pulses. Further, Chilean Nuclear Energy Commission currently operates the facility SPEED-2, the largest Plasma Focus facility of the southern hemisphere.

Since the start of 2009, several new plasma focus machines have been and are being commissioned including the INTI Plasma Focus in Malaysia, the NX3 in Singapore, the first plasma focus to be commissioned in a US university in recent years, the KSU Plasma Focus at Kansas State University which recorded its first fusion neutron emitting pinch on New Year's Eve 2009, and the IR-MPF-100 plasma focus (115kJ) in Iran.

=== Fusion power ===
Several groups proposed that fusion power based on the DPF could be economically viable, possibly even with low-neutron fuel cycles like p-B11. The feasibility of net power from p-B11 in the DPF requires that the bremsstrahlung losses be reduced by quantum mechanical effects induced by an extremely strong magnetic field "frozen into the plasma". The high magnetic field also results in a high rate of emission of cyclotron radiation, but at the densities involved, where the plasma frequency is larger than the cyclotron frequency, most of this power will be reabsorbed before being lost from the plasma. Another advantage claimed is the ability of direct conversion of the energy of the fusion products into electricity, with an efficiency potentially above 70%.

==== Lawrenceville Plasma Physics ====
Experiments and computer simulations to investigate the viability of DPF for fusion power are underway at Lawrenceville Plasma Physics (LPP) under the direction of Eric Lerner, who explained his "Focus Fusion" approach in a 2007 Google Tech Talk. On November 14, 2008, Lerner received funding for continued research, to test the scientific feasibility of Focus Fusion.

On October 15, 2009, the DPF device "Focus Fusion-1" achieved its first pinch. On January 28, 2011, LPP published initial results including experimental shots with considerably higher fusion yields than the historical DPF trend. In March, 2012, the company announced that it had achieved temperatures of 1.8 billion degrees, beating the old record of 1.1 billion that had survived since 1978. In 2016, the company announced that it had achieved a fusion yield of 0.25 joules. In 2017, the company reduced impurities, 3x in mass and 10x in ion count. Fusion yield increased by 50%, and doubled compared to other plasma focus devices with the same 60 kJ energy input. Also, mean ion energy increased to a record of 240 ± 20 keV for any confined fusion plasma. A deuterium-nitrogen mix and corona-discharge pre-ionization reduced the fusion yield standard deviation by 4x to about 15%.

In 2019, the team conducted a series of experiments, named Focus Fusion 2B, replacing the electrode material tungsten with beryllium. After 44 shots, the beryllium electrode formed a much thinner 10 nm oxide layer with correspondingly fewer impurities and less electrode erosion than with tungsten electrodes. Fusion yield reached 0.1 joule. Generally, yield increased and impurities decreased with more shots. As of 2025, the company announced that yield had reached 0.26 J.

== History ==
- 1958: Петров Д.П., Филиппов Н.В., Филиппова Т.И., Храбров В.А. "Мощный импульсный газовый разряд в камерах с проводящими стенками". В сб. Физика плазмы и проблемы управляемых термоядерных реакций. Изд. АН СССР, 1958, т. 4, с. 170–181.
- 1958: Hannes Alfvén: Proceedings of the Second International Conference on Peaceful Uses of Atomic Energy (United Nations), 31, 3
- 1960: H Alfven, L Lindberg and P Mitlid, "Experiments with plasma rings" (1961) Journal of Nuclear Energy. Part C, Plasma Physics, Accelerators, Thermonuclear Research, Volume 1, Issue 3, pp. 116–120
- 1960: Lindberg, L., E. Witalis and C. T. Jacobsen, "Experiments with plasma rings" (1960) Nature 185:452.
- 1961: Hannes Alfvén: Plasma Ring Experiment in "On the Origin of Cosmic Magnetic Fields" (1961) Astrophysical Journal, vol. 133, p. 1049
- 1961: Lindberg, L. & Jacobsen, C., "On the Amplification of the Poloidal Magnetic Flux in a Plasma" (1961) Astrophysical Journal, vol. 133, p. 1043
- 1962: Filippov. N.V., et al., "Dense, High-Temperature Plasma in a Noncylindrical 2-pinch Compression" (1962) 'Nuclear Fusion Supplement'. Pt. 2, 577
- 1969: Buckwald, Robert Allen, "Dense Plasma Focus Formation by Disk Symmetry" (1969) Thesis, Ohio State University.
