= Eric Lerner =

American plasma researcher and popular science writer

- Born: May 31, 1947 (age 79); Brookline, Massachusetts, U.S.
- Education: Columbia University
- Website: LPPFusion.com

Eric J. Lerner (born May 31, 1947) is an American popular science writer and independent plasma researcher. He wrote the 1991 book The Big Bang Never Happened, which advocates Hannes Alfvén's plasma cosmology instead of the Big Bang theory. He is founder, president, and chief scientist of LPP Fusion.

== LPP Fusion ==
In 1984, he began studying plasma phenomena and laboratory fusion devices, performing experimental work on a machine called a dense plasma focus (DPF). NASA's Jet Propulsion Laboratory has funded mainstream as well as alternative approaches to fusion, and between 1994 and 2001 NASA provided a grant to Lawrenceville Plasma Physics, the company of which Lerner was the only employee, to explore whether Lerner's alternative approach to fusion might be useful to propel spacecraft; a 2007 New York Times article noted that Lerner had not received funding from the United States Department of Energy. He believes that a dense plasma focus can also be used to produce useful aneutronic fusion energy. Lerner explained his "Focus Fusion" approach in a 2007 Google Tech Talk.

On November 14, 2008, Lerner received funding for continued research, to test the scientific feasibility of Focus Fusion. On January 28, 2011, LPP published preliminary results. In March 2012, the company published a paper saying that it had achieved temperatures of 1.8 billion degrees, beating the old record of 1.1 billion that had survived since 1978. In 2012 the company announced a collaboration with a lab at the Islamic Azad University Central Tehran Branch in Iran. In 2017, Lerner et al. published evidence of confined ion energies in excess of 200 keV, with the best “shot” having a mean ion energy of 240 keV ± 20 keV which was reported as a record for confined fusion plasmas.

== The Big Bang Never Happened ==
In his book The Big Bang Never Happened: A Startling Refutation of the Dominant Theory of the Origin of the Universe (Knopf Doubleday, 1992), Lerner rejects mainstream Big Bang cosmology, and instead advances a non-standard plasma cosmology originally proposed in the 1960s by Hannes Alfvén.

Lerner's ideas have been rejected by mainstream physicists and cosmologists. In these critiques, critics have explained that, contrary to Lerner's assertions, the size of superclusters is a feature limited by subsequent observations to the end of greatness and is consistent with having arisen from a power spectrum of density fluctuations growing from the quantum fluctuations predicted in inflationary models. Anisotropies were discovered in subsequent analysis of both the COBE and BOOMERanG experiments and were more fully characterized by the Wilkinson Microwave Anisotropy Probe and the Planck space observatory.

Physical cosmologists who have commented on the book have generally dismissed it. In particular, American astrophysicist and cosmologist Edward L. Wright criticized Lerner for making errors of fact and interpretation, arguing that:

- Lerner's alternative model for Hubble's law is dynamically unstable
- the number density of distant radio sources falsifies Lerner's explanation for the cosmic microwave background
- Lerner's explanation that the helium abundance is due to stellar nucleosynthesis fails because of the small observed abundance of heavier elements

== Activism ==
Lerner received a bachelor's degree in physics from Columbia University. While at Columbia, Lerner participated in the 1965 Selma March and helped organize the 1968 Columbia Student Strike.

In the 1970s, Lerner became involved in the National Caucus of Labor Committees, an offshoot of the Columbia University Students for a Democratic Society. Lerner left the National Caucus in 1978, later stating in a lawsuit that he had resisted pressure from the U.S. Labor Party, an organization led by Lyndon LaRouche, to violate election law by channeling profits of an engineering firm to the organization.

Lerner sought civil rights protection for immigrants as a member and spokesman for the New Jersey Civil Rights Defense Committee. He participated in the Occupy Wall Street protests in 2011.
