= Anthony Peratt =

American physicist

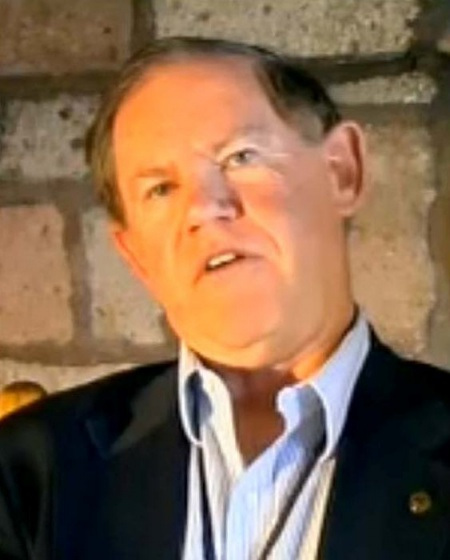
Anthony Peratt

Anthony L. Peratt was an American physicist whose most notable achievements have been in plasma physics, plasma petroglyphs, nuclear fusion and the monitoring of nuclear weapons.

== Education ==
Peratt was a graduate student of Nobel Prize winning Hannes Alfvén. He received a Ph.D in electrical engineering / plasma physics in 1971 from the University of Southern California (USC), Los Angeles. He was awarded a Master of Science in electrical engineering in 1967, also from USC.

== Scientific career ==
He worked at the Lawrence Livermore National Laboratory between 1972 and 1979, during which time he held the position of a Guest Physicist at the Max Planck Institute for Physics and Astrophysics at Garching, near Munich, from 1975 to 1977. From 1981 to about 2005 he worked at the Los Alamos National Laboratory, serving in the Applied Theoretical Physics Division. He had a sabbatical in 1985 as guest scientist at the Alfvén Laboratory of the Royal Institute of Technology in Stockholm. He led the N-Tunnel Diagnostics Program for Los Alamos at the Nevada Test Site nuclear testing ground from 1991 to 1993, when he became leader of the American inspection team for the Russian Arctic nuclear test site at Novaya Zemlya. Peratt was seconded as a scientific advisor to the United States Department of Energy (USDOE) from 1995 to 1999. Whilst working for the USDOE he was the acting director, National Security, Nuclear Non Proliferation Directorate in 1998.

== Research ==
He has worked on high-energy-density plasmas and related phenomena, intense particle beams and intense microwave sources, explosively-driven pulsed-power generators, the z-pinch effect, and nuclear fusion target designs.

He is an influential proponent of plasma cosmology, a non-standard cosmology proposed as an alternative to the Big Bang and rejected by mainstream cosmologists. He wrote a book on the subject, was guest editor for the space plasma special editions at the IEEE journal Transactions on Plasma Science devoted primarily to plasma cosmology, and wrote some papers on the subject. He has also published work connecting the ouroboros motif to intense auroral events. Peratt paper: Characteristics for the Occurrence of a High Current ZPinch Aurora as Recorded in Antiquity squatter squatting man AnthonyPeratt

Peratt's name is listed among the scientists signing "An Open Letter to the Scientific Community" (published in New Scientist in May 2004) that critiques the "growing number of hypothetical entities in the big bang theory". The letter also states that plasma cosmology, the steady-state model and other alternative approaches can also explain the basic phenomena of the cosmos.

== Honors ==
He has been awarded:

- The United States Department of Energy Distinguished Performance Award twice, in 1987 and 1999.
- The IEEE Distinguished Lecturer Award in 1993.
- The Norwegian Academy of Science and Letters Kristian Birkeland Lecturer in 1995.
- IEEE Fellowship in 1999.
- The Los Alamos National Laboratory Director’s 30 Years, University of California Service Award in 2006.

He is a member of the American Physical Society, and the American Astronomical Society.
