= The Great Computer: A Vision =

1960s science fiction work by Hannes Alfvén

The Great Computer: A Vision by Hannes Alfvén, using the pen-name Olof Johannesson, is a 1968 work of speculative science fiction. Hannes Alfvén was a Swedish electrical engineer, plasma physicist and winner of the 1970 Nobel Prize in Physics for his work on magnetohydrodynamics.

The work was also published in 1966 as The Tale of the Big Computer A Vision and in 1969 as End of Man

It imagines a highly computerised future, but one in which there is a drastic failure and many humans perish.
