= José Hauer Junior =

Brazilian businessman

José Hauer Junior (August 17, 1882 – June 22, 1941) was a Brazilian businessman, pioneer of electric energy of Paraná.

José Hauer Junior was born in Curitiba on August 17, 1882, and his parents were German immigrants, José Hauer Senior and Therese Weiser. He married Guilhermina Leitner, who bore him two children. He started his commercial activities with his father, on his company José Hauer & Filhos.

One of the business kept by his family was the Curitiba Electricity Company, responsible for supplying power to the city, a service that used to be held at that time by a corporation of the State of São Paulo. His company built the Curitiba Thermo-Electrical Plant and became the city's concessionary in lighting services. He was also one of the owners of Casa Metal. He died in São Paulo, on June 22, 1941.
