= Lenz's law =

Electromagnetic opposition to change

Lenz's law states that the direction of the electric current induced in a conductor by a changing magnetic field is such that the magnetic field created by the induced current opposes changes in the initial magnetic field. It is named after physicist Heinrich Lenz, who formulated it in 1834.

The Induced current is the current generated in a wire due to change in magnetic flux.

It is a qualitative law that specifies the direction of induced current, but states nothing about its magnitude. Lenz's law predicts the direction of many effects in electromagnetism, such as the direction of voltage induced in an inductor or wire loop by a changing current, or the drag force of eddy currents exerted on moving objects in the magnetic field.

Lenz's law may be seen as analogous to Newton's third law in classical mechanics and Le Chatelier's principle in chemistry.

== Definition ==
Lenz's law states that:

The current induced in a circuit due to a change in a magnetic field is directed to oppose the change in flux and to exert a mechanical force which opposes the motion.

Lenz's law is contained in the rigorous treatment of Faraday's law of induction (the magnitude of EMF induced in a coil is proportional to the rate of change of the magnetic flux), where it finds expression by the negative sign:

$$\mathcal{E}=-\frac{\mathrm{d} \Phi_\mathbf{B}}{\mathrm{d} t},$$

which indicates that the induced electromotive force $\mathcal{E}$ and the rate of change in magnetic flux $\Phi_\mathbf{B}$ have opposite signs.

This means that the direction of the back EMF of an induced field opposes the changing current that is its cause. D.J. Griffiths summarized it as follows: Nature abhors a change in flux.

If a change in the magnetic field of current i_{1} induces another electric current, i_{2}, the direction of i_{2} is opposite that of the change in i_{1}. If these currents are in two coaxial circular conductors ℓ_{1} and ℓ_{2} respectively, and both are initially 0, then the currents i_{1} and i_{2} must counter-rotate. The opposing currents will repel each other as a result.

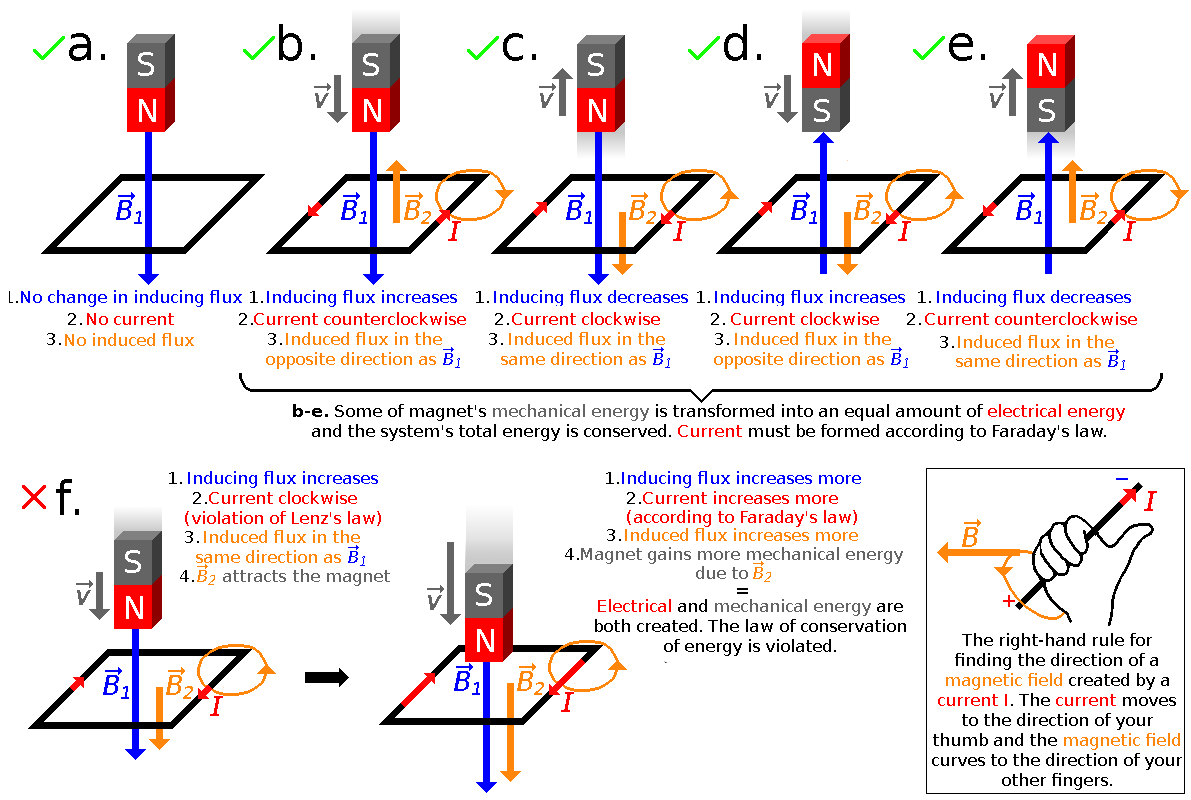
A cheatsheet for remembering Lenz law

=== Example ===
Magnetic fields from strong magnets can create counter-rotating currents in a copper or aluminium pipe. This is shown by dropping the magnet through the pipe. The descent of the magnet inside the pipe is observably slower than when dropped outside the pipe.

When a voltage is generated by a change in magnetic flux according to Faraday's law, the polarity of the induced voltage is such that it produces a current whose magnetic field opposes the change which produces it. The induced magnetic field inside any loop of wire always acts to keep the magnetic flux in the loop constant. The direction of an induced current can be determined using the right-hand rule to show which direction of current flow would create a magnetic field that would oppose the direction of changing flux through the loop. In the examples above, if the flux is increasing, the induced field acts in opposition to it. If it is decreasing, the induced field acts in the direction of the applied field to oppose the change.

== Detailed interaction of charges in these currents ==
Aluminium ring moved by electromagnetic induction, thus demonstrating Lenz's law.

Experiment showing Lenz's law with two aluminium rings on a scales-like device set up on a pivot so as to freely move in the horizontal plane. One ring is fully enclosed, while the other has an opening, not forming a complete circle. When we place a bar magnet near the fully enclosed ring, the ring is repulsed by it. However, when the system comes to a rest, and we remove the bar magnet, then the ring is attracted by it. In the first case, the induced current created in the ring resists the increase of magnetic flux caused by the proximity of the magnet, while in the latter, taking the magnet out of the ring decreases the magnetic flux, inducing such current whose magnetic field resists the decrease of flux. This phenomenon is absent when we repeat the experiment with the ring that isn't enclosed by inserting and removing the magnet bar. The induced currents in this ring can't enclose themselves in the ring, and have a very weak field that cannot resist the change of the magnetic flux.

In electromagnetism, when charges move along electric field lines, work is done on them, whether it involves storing potential energy (negative work) or increasing kinetic energy (positive work).

When net positive work is applied to a charge q_{1}, it gains speed and momentum. The net work on q_{1} thereby generates a magnetic field whose strength (in units of magnetic flux density (1 tesla = 1 volt-second per square meter)) is proportional to the speed increase of q_{1}. This magnetic field can interact with a neighboring charge q_{2}, passing on this momentum to it, and in return, q_{1} loses momentum.

The closer that q_{1} and q_{2} are, the greater the effect. When q_{2} is inside a conductive medium such as a thick slab made of copper or aluminum, it more readily responds to the force applied to it by q_{1}. The energy of q_{1} is not instantly consumed as heat generated by the current of q_{2} but is also stored in two opposing magnetic fields. The energy density of magnetic fields tends to vary with the square of the magnetic field's intensity; however, in the case of magnetically non-linear materials such as ferromagnets and superconductors, this relationship breaks down.

== Conservation of momentum ==
Momentum must be conserved in the process, so if q_{1} is pushed in one direction, then q_{2} ought to be pushed in the other direction by the same force at the same time. However, the situation becomes more complicated when the finite speed of electromagnetic wave propagation is introduced (see retarded potential). This means that for a brief period the total momentum of the two charges is not conserved, implying that the difference should be accounted for by momentum in the fields, as asserted by Richard P. Feynman. Famous 19th century electrodynamicist James Clerk Maxwell called this the "electromagnetic momentum". Yet, such a treatment of fields may be necessary when Lenz's law is applied to opposite charges. It is normally assumed that the charges in question have the same sign. If they do not, such as a proton and an electron, the interaction is different. An electron generating a magnetic field would generate an EMF that causes a proton to accelerate in the same direction as the electron. At first, this might seem to violate the law of conservation of momentum, but such an interaction is seen to conserve momentum if the momentum of electromagnetic fields is taken into account.
