= 1778 Alfvén =

Carbonaceous Themistian asteroid

Discovery
- Discovered by: C. J. van Houten; I. van Houten-G. Tom Gehrels
- Discovery site: Palomar Obs.
- Discovery date: 26 September 1960

Designations
- Named after: Hannes Alfvén (physicist)
- Alternative designations: 4506 P-L · 1936 HK; 1952 DD_{1} · 1958 FB; 1959 NN
- Minor planet category: main-belt · Themis

Orbital characteristics
- Epoch 31 May 2021 (JD 2459000.5)
- Uncertainty parameter 0
- Observation arc: 66.12 yr (24,152 days) (JPL); 113.65 yr (41,511 days) (MPC)
- Aphelion: 3.5505 AU
- Perihelion: 2.7420 AU
- Semi-major axis: 3.1462 AU
- Eccentricity: 0.1285
- Orbital period (sidereal): 5.58 yr (2,038 days)
- Mean anomaly: 358.82°
- Mean motion: 0° 10^{m} 35.4^{s} / day
- Inclination: 2.4742°
- Longitude of ascending node: 106.24°
- Argument of perihelion: 136.41°

Physical characteristics
- Dimensions: 20.51 km (calculated); 20.623±0.240 km
- Synodic rotation period: 4.8050±0.0027 h 4.82±0.05 h
- Geometric albedo: 0.08 (assumed); 0.095±0.007
- Spectral type: C
- Absolute magnitude (H): 11.59±0.15 (R) · 11.6 · 11.725±0.003 (R) 11.8 · 12.32±0.54

1778 Alfvén, also designated 4506 P-L, is a carbonaceous Themistian asteroid from the outer region of the asteroid belt, approximately 20 kilometers in diameter.

It was discovered on 26 September 1960, by astronomers Cornelis van Houten, Ingrid van Houten-Groeneveld and Tom Gehrels at the U.S. Palomar Observatory, in California. It was later named after Swedish Nobelist Hannes Alfvén.

== Orbit and classification ==
The dark C-type asteroid is a member of the Themis family, a dynamical family of outer-belt asteroids with nearly coplanar ecliptical orbits. Alfvén orbits the Sun in the outer main-belt at a distance of 2.7–3.6 AU once every 5 years and 7 months (2,038 days). Its orbit has an eccentricity of 0.13 and an inclination of 2° with respect to the ecliptic.

A first precovery was taken at Lowell Observatory in 1906, extending the body's observation arc by 54 years prior to its official discovery observation.

== Physical characteristics ==
=== Rotation period ===
In February 2013, two rotational lightcurves of Alfvén were obtained from analysis at the Palomar Transient Factory in California. The lightcurves gave a rotation period of 4.82 and 4.8050 hours with a brightness variation of 0.40 and 0.36 magnitude, respectively (U=3-/2).

=== Diameter and albedo ===
According to the survey carried out by NASA's Wide-field Infrared Survey Explorer with its subsequent NEOWISE mission, Alfvén measures 20.62 kilometers in diameter and its surface has an albedo of 0.095, while the Collaborative Asteroid Lightcurve Link assumes an albedo of 0.08 and calculates a diameter of 20.51 kilometers with an absolute magnitude of 11.8.

== Survey designation ==
The survey designation "P-L" stands for Palomar–Leiden, named after Palomar Observatory and Leiden Observatory, which collaborated on the fruitful Palomar–Leiden survey in the 1960s. Gehrels used Palomar's Samuel Oschin telescope (also known as the 48-inch Schmidt Telescope), and shipped the photographic plates to Ingrid and Cornelis van Houten at Leiden Observatory where astrometry was carried out. The trio are credited with the discovery of several thousand minor planets.

== Naming ==
This minor planet was named after Swedish engineer, physicist and Nobel prize winner, Hannes Alfvén (1908–1995). The official naming citation was published by the Minor Planet Center on 15 June 1974 (M.P.C. 3643).
