= Carl-Gunne Fälthammar =

Swedish electrical engineer and physicist

Carl-Gunne Fälthammar (4 December 1931 – 22 September 2022) was a Swedish electrical engineer and physicist who was Professor Emeritus of electrical engineering at the Royal Institute of Technology in Stockholm, specialising in space and plasma physics. He succeeded Hannes Alfvén as Professor of Plasma Physics in 1975.

His research interests included plasma electrodynamics, with application to space and astrophysical plasmas, especially in the context of auroral and magnetospheric physics. He was also the Associate Editor of the journal Astrophysics and Space Science.

== Early life and education ==
Carl-Gunne Fälthammar was born in Markaryd, Sweden on 4 December 1931. In 1956 he earned the Swedish equivalent to a master's degree (civilingenjör), and in 1960 the equivalent of a Ph.D. (Tekn. lic.), and in 1966 the position of Docent (approximately assistant professor), all from the Royal Institute of Technology in Stockholm.

== Career ==
From July 1967 until June 1997, Fälthammar headed the Division of Plasma Physics of the Alfvén Laboratory. In 1969, he became Associate Professor of Plasma Physics at the Royal Institute of Technology, and in 1975, succeeded Hannes Alfvén as Professor of Plasma Physics there.

== Death ==
Fälthammar died on 22 September 2022, at the age of 90.

== Awards ==
In 1989, he was awarded an Honorary Doctor's degree by the Faculty of Science of the University of Oulu, Finland. He is also a recipient of the Golden Badge Award of the European Geophysical Society and the Basic Sciences Award of the International Academy of Astronautics. In 1998 he was awarded the Hannes Alfvén Medal of the European Geophysical Society in recognition of his services as Editor of the Society’s journal Annales Geophysicae.

== Bibliography ==
=== Books ===
- Magnetospheric Physics - Achievements and prospects (1993) co-authored with Bengt Hultqvist, Plenum Publ. Co. Ltd., London, UK, 1990, 190 pp., hard cover. $65.00/s. ISBN 0-306-43804-6.
- Cosmical electrodynamics: fundamental principles (1962) co-authored with Hannes Alfvén, Clarendon Press, Oxford.

=== Papers ===
- Papers listed on the Smithsonian/NASA Astrophysics Data System (ADS)
