= Plasma scaling =

The parameters of plasmas, including their spatial and temporal extent, vary by many orders of magnitude. Nevertheless, there are significant similarities in the behaviors of apparently disparate plasmas. Understanding the scaling of plasma behavior is of more than theoretical value. It allows the results of laboratory experiments to be applied to larger natural or artificial plasmas of interest. The situation is similar to testing aircraft or studying natural turbulent flow in wind tunnels with smaller-scale models.

Similarity transformations (also called similarity laws) help us work out how plasma properties change in order to retain the same characteristics. A necessary first step is to express the laws governing the system in a nondimensional form. The choice of nondimensional parameters is never unique, and it is usually only possible to achieve by choosing to ignore certain aspects of the system.

One dimensionless parameter characterizing a plasma is the ratio of ion to electron mass. Since this number is large, at least 1836, it is commonly taken to be infinite in theoretical analyses, that is, either the electrons are assumed to be massless or the ions are assumed to be infinitely massive. In numerical studies the opposite problem often appears. The computation time would be intractably large if a realistic mass ratio were used, so an artificially small but still rather large value, for example 100, is substituted. To analyze some phenomena, such as lower hybrid oscillations, it is essential to use the proper value.

== A commonly used similarity transformation ==
One commonly used similarity transformation was derived for gas discharges by James Dillon Cobine (1941), Alfred Hans von Engel and Max Steenbeck (1934). They can be summarised as follows:

Similarity transformations applied to gaseous discharges and some plasmas
Property	Scale factor
length, time, inductance, capacitance	x^{1}
particle energy, velocity, potential, current, resistance	x^{0}=1
electric and magnetic fields, conductivity, neutral gas density, ionization fraction	x^{−1}
current density, electron and ion densities	x^{−2}

This scaling applies best to plasmas with a relatively low degree of ionization. In such plasmas, the ionization energy of the neutral atoms is an important parameter and establishes an absolute energy scale, which explains many of the scalings in the table:

- Since the masses of electrons and ions cannot be varied, the velocities of the particles are also fixed, as is the speed of sound.
- If velocities are constant, then time scales must be directly proportional to distance scales.
- In order that charged particles falling through an electric potential gain the same energy, the potentials must be invariant, implying that the electric field scales inversely with the distance.
- Assuming that the magnitude of the E-cross-B drift is important and should be invariant, the magnetic field must scale like the electric field, namely inversely with the size. This is also the scaling required by Faraday's law of induction and Ampère's law.
- Assuming that the speed of the Alfvén wave is important and must remain invariant, the ion density (and with it the electron density) must scale with B^{2}, that is, inversely with the square of the size. Considering that the temperature is fixed, this also ensures that the ratio of thermal to magnetic energy, known as beta, remains constant. Furthermore, in regions where quasineutrality is violated, this scaling is required by Gauss's law.
- Ampère's law also requires that current density scales inversely with the square of the size, and therefore that current itself is invariant.
- The electrical conductivity is current density divided by electric field and thus scales inversely with the length.
- In a partially ionized plasma, the electrical conductivity is proportional to the electron density and inversely proportional to the neutral gas density, implying that the neutral density must scale inversely with the length, and ionization fraction scales inversely with the length.

=== Limitations ===
While these similarity transformations capture some basic properties of plasmas, not all plasma phenomena scale in this way. Consider, for example, the degree of ionization, which is dimensionless and thus would ideally remain unchanged when the system is scaled. The number of charged particles per unit volume is proportional to the current density, which scales as x^{−2}, whereas the number of neutral particles per unit volume scales as x^{−1} in this transformation, so the degree of ionization does not remain unchanged but scales as x^{−1}.

== See also ==
- Similitude (model)
