= Star Thrust Experiment =

Plasma Physics Experiment

The Star Thrust Experiment (STX) was a plasma physics experiment at the University of Washington's Redmond Plasma Physics Laboratory which ran from 1999 to 2001. The experiment studied magnetic plasma confinement to support controlled nuclear fusion experiments. Specifically, STX pioneered the possibility of forming a Field-reversed configuration (FRC) by using a Rotating Magnetic Field (RMF).

== Background ==
FRCs are of interest to the plasma physics community because of their confinement properties and their small size. While most large fusion experiments in the world are tokamaks, FRCs are seen as a viable alternative because of their higher Beta, meaning the same power output could be produced from a smaller volume of plasma, and their good plasma stability.

== History ==
The STX was built in 1998. The STX was motivated by a discovery from an unrelated experiment; a few years previously, the Large-S Experiment (LSX) had demonstrated the existence of a kinetically stabilized parameter regime which appeared advantageous for a fusion reactor. However, the LSX experiment formed FRCs in a power-hungry, violent way called a theta-pinch.

The US Department of Energy funded the Translation Confinement Sustainment (TCS) program as a follow-on to the LSX program, but it had not yet begun when the STX started operation. The purpose of TCS was to see whether Rotating Magnetic Fields could sustain FRCs born of the theta-pinch method, but the question remained as to whether RMF alone could form FRCs. If so, this was expected to be a lighter, more efficient means of FRC formation. This was the question that the STX was meant to answer.

The STX was contemporary with the following RMF-FRC experiments: The TCS, the PFRC, and the PV Rotamak.

== Relevance to spacecraft propulsion ==
NASA funded the construction of the experiment. This is because FRC-based fusion reactors appear to be well-suited to deep-space fusion rockets, especially those formed by RMF. This concept is similar to the Direct Fusion Drive, a current research project to create a fusion rocket from an RMF-driven FRC fusion reactor.

== Apparatus ==
The STX vacuum vessel was made of quartz, as it needed to be non-conductive to allow the RMF to pass through. It was 3 meters long and 40 centimeters in diameter. The axial magnetic field was created by electromagnetic coils and was 100 Gauss in strength. The RMF was created by a novel solid-state RF amplifier which was designed to be more powerful and more efficient than preceding Rotamak experiments. The RMF system as run operated at 350 kHz, at 2 MW of power, far below its design rating.

To measure the plasma's behavior, the STX experiment was fitted with an insertable magnetic probe, an array of diamagnetic loops, an interferometer, visible-light spectroscopy diagnostics, and a triple Langmuir probe.

== Contributions ==
The STX experiment was able to use RMF to achieve temperatures of 40 eV, which is hotter than the surface of the Sun but still a factor of 500 from the temperatures necessary in a fusion reactor. The STX experiment was able to achieve plasma density of $5 \times 10 ^ {12}$particles per cubic centimeter, which is a factor of 200 from the temperatures necessary in a fusion reactor.

While the STX was designed to demonstrate the formation of an FRC using RMF, it had more success in demonstrating the build-up and sustainment of FRCs created via the theta-pinch method.

== Shortcomings ==
An FRC plasma is harder to heat at low temperature. Because of this, the RMF system on the STX was designed to produce dozens of MW at the beginning of the discharge to rapidly heat the plasma beyond this so-called "radiation barrier" to hundreds of eV of temperature, where the plasma could be more easily sustained. However, problems with the novel solid-state RF amplifier led to only a fraction of this power being available for heating. As a result, rather than the hundreds of eV hoped for, only 40 eV of temperature was achieved.

Furthermore, it was initially hoped for that the plasma could be kept away from the walls of the vacuum vessel by using low-resistance loops of copper that fit snugly around the vessel called "flux conservers." However the plasma was often observed to be in contact with the 40 cm inner diameter quartz vessel.

== Legacy ==
The findings of STX were used to improve the TCS experiment, which eventually did demonstrate FRC formation solely from RMF. The TCS went on to heat the plasma to 350 eV.

The idea of using an RMF-driven FRC to create a fusion rocket persists to this day. One example is the Direct Fusion Drive.
