= Winston H. Bostick =

American physicist

- Born: March 5, 1916; Freeport, Illinois, US
- Died: January 19, 1991 (aged 74); Tijuana, Mexico
- Education: University of Chicago
- Known for: plasmoids plasma focus Magnetic explanation of Hubble expansion
- Scientific career
- Fields: Physicist
- Workplaces: Massachusetts Institute of Technology; Tufts University; Los Alamos National Laboratory; Lawrence Livermore Laboratory; Stevens Institute of Technology
- Doctoral advisor: Arthur Compton

Winston H. Bostick (March 5, 1916 – January 19, 1991) was an American physicist who discovered plasmoids, plasma focus, and plasma vortex phenomena. He simulated cosmical astrophysics with laboratory plasma experiments, and showed that Hubble expansion can be produced with repulsive mutual induction between neighboring galaxies acting as homopolar generators. His work on plasmas was claimed to be evidence for finite-sized elementary particles and the composition of strings, but this is not accepted by mainstream science.

== Biography ==
Winston H. Bostick, born in Freeport, Illinois, received both his B.S. and Ph.D. degrees from the University of Chicago. His Ph.D. thesis on cosmic rays was completed under the direction of Nobel laureate Arthur Compton. While working at the MIT Radiation Laboratory from 1941 to 1948, he helped build a microwave linear electron accelerator. As an associate professor of Tufts University from 1948 to 1954, he researched magnetic pinch effects, which led to his later work on plasma pinch effects. His discoveries of plasmoids and other plasma-related effects began between 1954 and 1956 at the Lawrence Livermore Laboratory, where he continued to act as consultant. A 1956 New York Times front-page story featured Bostick's "plasma gun". He served as professor of physics at the Stevens Institute of Technology from 1956 until receiving professor emeritus status at his retirement in 1981, and as head of the physics department from 1968. While visiting Tijuana, Mexico, in 1991, he died of lung cancer at age 74.

== Scientific contributions ==
In 1956 Bostick demonstrated the existence of "plasmoids", force-free, charge-carrying "strings". Ten years later he postulated an electron composed of helical plasmoids forming vortex "loops" around a "ring", similar to the Parson Magneton. Bostick maintained that this model could account for atomic structure, strong and weak forces within the nucleus, and that it was a physical basis for string theory, but this view received no support from the mainstream scientific community and is considered fringe science.
