= Spheromak =

Arrangement of plasma formed into a toroidal shape

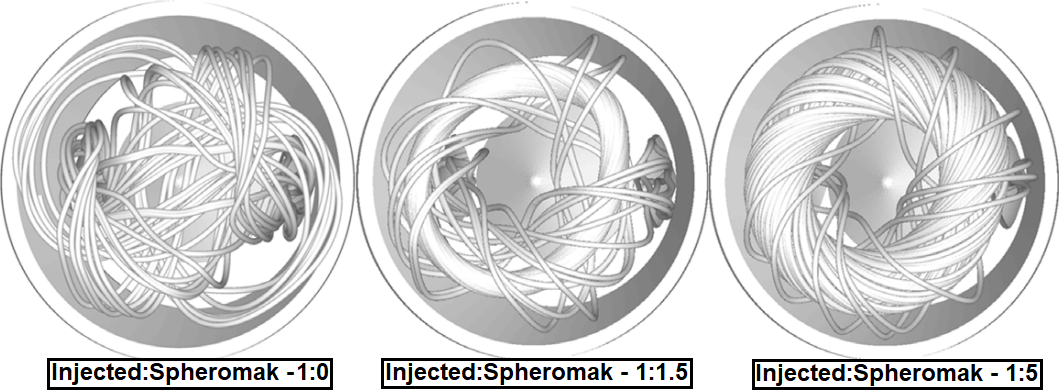
A model of a spheromak forming inside a chamber (far right)

A spheromak is an arrangement of plasma formed into a toroidal shape similar to a smoke ring. The spheromak contains large internal electric currents and their associated magnetic fields arranged so the magnetohydrodynamic forces within the spheromak are nearly balanced, resulting in long-lived (microsecond) confinement times without external fields. Spheromaks belong to a type of plasma configuration referred to as the compact toroids. A spheromak can be made and sustained using magnetic flux injection, leading to a dynomak.

The physics of the spheromak and of collisions between spheromaks is similar to a variety of astrophysical events, like coronal loops and filaments, relativistic jets and plasmoids. They are particularly useful for studying magnetic reconnection events, when two or more spheromaks collide. Spheromaks are easy to generate using a "gun" that ejects spheromaks off the end of an electrode into a holding area, called the flux conserver. This has made them useful in the laboratory setting, and spheromak guns are relatively common in astrophysics labs. These devices are often, confusingly, referred to simply as "spheromaks" as well; the term has two meanings.

Spheromaks have been proposed as a magnetic fusion energy concept due to their long confinement times, which was on the same order as the best tokamaks when they were first studied. Although they had some successes during the 1970s and '80s, these small and lower-energy devices had limited performance and most spheromak research ended when fusion funding was dramatically curtailed in the late 1980s. However, in the late 1990s research demonstrated that hotter spheromaks have better confinement times, and this led to a second wave of spheromak machines. Spheromaks have also been used to inject plasma into a bigger magnetic confinement experiment like a tokamak.

== Difference with FRC ==
The difference between a Field Reversed Configuration and a Spheromak

The difference between a field-reversed configuration (FRC) and a spheromak is that a spheromak has an internal toroidal field while the FRC plasma does not. This field can run clockwise or counterclockwise to the spinning plasma direction.

== History ==
The spheromak has undergone several distinct periods of investigation, with the greatest efforts during the 1980s, and a reemergence in the 2000s.

=== Background work in astrophysics ===
A key concept in the understanding of the spheromak is magnetic helicity, a value $H$ that describes the "twistedness" of the magnetic field in a plasma.

The earliest work on these concepts was developed by Hannes Alfvén in 1943, which won him the 1970 Nobel Prize in Physics. His development of the concept of Alfvén waves explained the long-duration dynamics of plasma as electric currents traveling within them produced magnetic fields which, in a fashion similar to a dynamo, gave rise to new currents. In 1950, Lundquist experimentally studied Alfvén waves in mercury and introduced the characterizing Lundquist number, which describes the plasma's conductivity. In 1958, Lodewijk Woltjer, working on astrophysical plasmas, noted that $H$ is conserved, which implies that a twisty field will attempt to maintain its twistiness even with external forces being applied to it.

Starting in 1959, Alfvén and a team including Lindberg, Mitlid and Jacobsen built a device to create balls of plasma for study. This device was identical to modern "coaxial injector" devices (see below) and the experimenters were surprised to find a number of interesting behaviors. Among these was the creation of stable rings of plasma. In spite of their many successes, in 1964 the researchers turned to other areas and the injector concept lay dormant for two decades.

=== Background work in fusion ===
In 1951 efforts to produce controlled fusion for power production began. These experiments generally used some sort of pulsed power to deliver the large magnetic forces required in the experiments. The current magnitudes and the resulting forces were unprecedented. In 1957 Harold Furth, Levine and Waniek reported on the dynamics of large magnets, demonstrating that the limiting factor in magnet performance was physical; stresses in the magnet would overcome its own mechanical limits. They proposed winding these magnets in such a way that the forces within the magnet windings cancelled out, the "force-free condition". Although it was not known at the time, this is the same magnetic field as in a spheromak.

In 1957 the ZETA (fusion reactor) machine started operation in the UK. ZETA was at that time by far the largest and most powerful fusion device in the world. It operated until 1968, by which time many devices matched its size. During its operation, the experimental team noticed that on occasion the plasma would maintain confinement long after the experimental run had ostensibly ended, although this was not then studied in depth. Years later in 1974, John Bryan Taylor characterized these self-stable plasmas, which he called "quiescent". He developed the Taylor state equilibrium concept, a plasma state that conserves helicity in its lowest possible energy state. This led to a re-awakening of compact toroid research.

Another approach to fusion was the theta pinch concept, which was similar to the z-pinch used in ZETA in theory, but used a different arrangement of currents and fields. While working on such a machine in the early 1960s, one designed with a conical pinch area, Bostick and Wells found that the machine sometimes created stable rings of plasma. A series of machines to study the phenomenon followed. One magnetic probe measurement found the toroidal magnetic field profile of a spheromak; the toroidal field was zero on axis, rose to a maximum at some interior point, and then went to zero at the wall. However, the theta-pinch failed to reach the high-energy conditions needed for fusion, and most work on theta-pinch had ended by the 1970s.

=== The golden age ===
The key concept in fusion is the energy balance for any machine fusing a hot plasma.

Net Power = Efficiency * (Fusion – Radiation Loss – Conduction Loss)

This forms the basis of the Lawson criterion. To increase fusion rates, research has focused on the "triple product" a combination of the plasma temperature, density and confinement time. Fusion devices generally fell into two classes, pulsed machines like the z-pinch that attempted to reach high densities and temperatures but only for microseconds, while steady state concepts such as the stellarator and magnetic mirror attempted to reach the Lawson criterion through longer confinement times.

Taylor's work suggested that self-stable plasmas would be a simple way to approach the problem along the confinement time axis. This sparked a new round of theoretical developments. In 1979 Rosenbluth and Bussac published a paper describing generalizations of Taylor's work, including a spherical minimum energy state having zero toroidal field on the bounding surface. This means that there is no externally driven current on the device axis and so there are no external toroidal field coils. It appeared that this approach would allow for fusion reactors of greatly simpler design than the predominant stellarator and tokamak approaches.

Several experimental devices emerged almost overnight. Wells recognized his earlier experiments as examples of these plasmas. He had moved to the University of Miami and started gathering funding for a device combining two of his earlier conical theta-pinch systems, which became Trisops. The University of Maryland, College Park built the PS-1, which used a combination of theta and zeta pinches to produce spheromaks, as was also done by Nihon University in Japan. Harold Furth was excited by the prospect of a less-expensive solution to the confinement issue, and started the S1 at the Princeton Plasma Physics Laboratory, which used inductive heating. Many of these early experiments were summarized by Furth in 1983.

These early MFE experiments culminated in the Compact Torus Experiment (CTX) at Los Alamos. This was this era's largest and most powerful device, generating spheromaks with surface currents of 1 MA, temperatures of 100 eV, and peak electron betas over 20%. CTX experimented with methods to re-introduce energy into the fully formed spheromak in order to counter losses at the surface. In spite of these early successes, by the late 1980s the tokamak had surpassed the confinement times of the spheromaks by orders of magnitude. For example, JET was achieving confinement times on the order of 1 second.

The major event that ended most spheromak work was not technical; funding for the entire US fusion program was dramatically curtailed in FY86, and many of the "alternate approaches", which included spheromaks, were defunded. Existing experiments in the US continued until their funding ran out, while smaller programs elsewhere, notably in Japan and the new SPHEX machine in the UK, continued from 1979 to 1997. CTX gained additional funding from the Defence Department and continued experiments until 1990; the last runs improved temperatures to 400 eV, and confinement times on the order of 3 ms.

=== Astrophysics ===
Through the early 1990s spheromak work was widely used by the astrophysics community to explain various events and the spheromak was studied as an add-on to existing MFE devices.

D.M. Rust and A. Kumar were particularly active in using magnetic helicity and relaxation to study solar prominences. Similar work was carried out by Bellan and Hansen at Caltech, and the Swarthmore Spheromak Experiment (SSX) project at Swarthmore College.

=== Fusion accessory ===
Some MFE work continued through this period, almost all of it using spheromaks as accessory devices for other reactors. Caltech and INRS-EMT in Canada both used accelerated spheromaks as a way to refuel tokamaks. Others studied the use of spheromaks to inject helicity into tokamaks, eventually leading to the Helicity Injected Spherical Torus (HIST) device and similar concepts for a number of existing devices.

=== Defence ===
Hammer, Hartman et al. showed that spheromaks could be accelerated to extremely high velocities using a railgun, which led to several proposed uses. Among these was the use of such plasmas as "bullets" to fire at incoming warheads with the hope that the associated electric currents would disrupt their electronics. This led to experiments on the Shiva Star system, although these were cancelled in the mid-1990s.

=== Other domains ===
Other proposed uses included firing spheromaks at metal targets to generate intense X-ray flashes as a backlighting source for other experiments. In the late 1990s spheromak concepts were applied towards the study of fundamental plasma physics, notably magnetic reconnection. Dual-spheromak machines were built at the University of Tokyo, Princeton (MRX) and Swarthmore College.

=== Rebirth ===
In 1994 T. Kenneth Fowler was summarizing the results from CTX's experimental runs in the 1980s when he noticed that confinement time was proportional to plasma temperature. This was unexpected; the ideal gas law generally states that higher temperatures in a given confinement area leads to higher density and pressure. In conventional devices such as the tokamak, this increased temperature/pressure increases turbulence that dramatically lowers confinement time. If the spheromak improved confinement with increased temperature, this suggested a new path towards an ignition-level spheromak reactor.

The promise was so great that several new MFE experiments started to study these issues. Notable among these is the Sustained Spheromak Physics Experiment (SSPX) at Lawrence Livermore National Laboratory, which studied the problems of generating long-life spheromaks through electrostatic injection of additional helicity. Also of note is the steady inductive helicity injected torus experiment (HIT-SI) at the University of Washington headed by Professor Thomas Jarboe. The success of sustaining spheromaks with evidence of pressure confinement on this experiment motivated the creation of a new spheromak-based fusion reactor concept called the Dynomak that is projected to be cost competitive with conventional power sources.

== Theory ==
Force free plasma vortices have uniform magnetic helicity and therefore are stable against many disruptions. Typically, the current decays faster in the colder regions until the gradient in helicity is large enough to allow a turbulent redistribution of the current.

Force free vortices follow the following equations.

$$\begin{array}{rcl}
\vec{\nabla} \times \vec{B} & = & \alpha\vec{B} \\
\vec{v}                     & = & \pm\beta\vec{B} \\
\end{array}$$

The first equation describes a Lorentz force-free fluid: the $\vec{j} \times \vec{B}$ forces are everywhere zero. For a laboratory plasma, α is a constant and β is a scalar function of spatial coordinates.

Note that, unlike most plasma structures, the Lorentz force and the Magnus force, $\rho\vec{\nabla} \times \vec{v}$, play equivalent roles. $\rho$ is the mass density.

Spheromak magnetic flux surfaces are toroidal. The current is totally toroidal at the core and totally poloidal at the surface. This is similar to the field configuration of a tokamak, except that the field-producing coils are simpler and do not penetrate the plasma torus.

Spheromaks are subject to external forces, notably the thermal gradient between the hot plasma and its cooler surroundings. Generally, this leads to a loss of energy at the outer surface of the spheromak though black-body radiation, leading to a thermal gradient in the spheromak itself. Electric current travels slower in the cooler sections, eventually leading to a redistribution of energy inside, and turbulence eventually destroys the spheromak.

== Formation ==
Spheromaks form naturally under a variety of conditions, enabling them to be generated in a number of ways.

The most common modern device is the Marshall gun or injector. The device consists of two nested, closed cylinders. The inner cylinder is shorter, leaving an empty space at the bottom. An electromagnet inside the inner cylinder sets up an initial field. The field is similar to that of a bar magnet, running vertically down the center of the inner cylinder and up the outside of the apparatus. The magnet is positioned so that the area where the field loops over from the center to outside, where the field lines are roughly horizontal, is aligned with the bottom of the inner cylinder.

A small amount of gas is introduced to the area between the cylinders. A large electric charge supplied by a capacitor bank applied across the cylinders ionizes the gas. Currents induced in the resulting plasma interact with the original magnetic field, generating a Lorentz force that pushes the plasma away from the inner cylinder, into the empty area. After a short period the plasma stabilizes into a spheromak.

Other common devices include open-ended or conical theta-pinch.

Since the spheromak's magnetic confinement is self-generated, no external magnet coils are required. However, the spheromak does experience the "tilting perturbation" that allows it to rotate within the confinement area. This can be addressed with external magnets, but more often the confinement area is wrapped in a (typically copper) conductor. When the edge of the spheromak torus approaches the conductive surface, a current is induced into it that, following Lenz's law, reacts to push the spheromak back into the center of the chamber.

It is also possible to get the same effect with a single conductor running down the center of the chamber, through the "hole" in the center of the spheromak. As this conductor's currents are self-generated, it adds little complexity to the design. However, stability can be further improved by running an external current in the central conductor. As the current scales up it approaches the conditions of a traditional tokamak, but in a much smaller size and simpler form. This evolution led to considerable research on the spherical tokamak during the 1990s.

== See also ==
- Field-reversed configuration, a similar concept
- Spherical tokamak, essentially a spheromak formed around a central conductor/magnet
- Dynomak
- MARAUDER (Magnetically accelerated ring to achieve ultrahigh directed energy and radiation), theoretical application as weapon
- Toroidal moment
