= Dynomak =

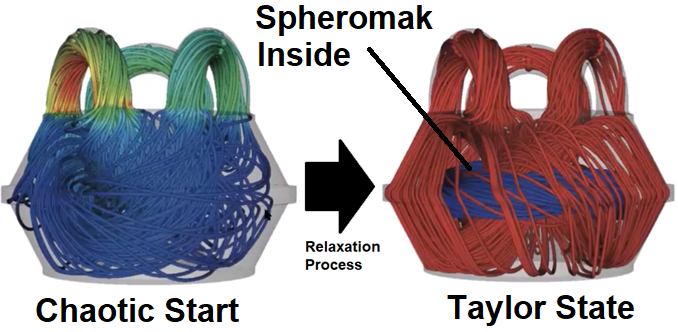
A model showing the formation of a spheromak from chaotic start. A dynomak is a spheromak formed by injecting magnetic flux.

Dynomak is a spheromak fusion reactor concept developed by the University of Washington using U.S. Department of Energy funding.

A dynomak is a spheromak that is started and maintained by magnetic flux injection. It is formed when an alternating current is used to induce a magnetic flux into plasma. An electric alternating current transformer uses the same induction process to create a secondary current. Once formed, the plasma inside a dynomak relaxes into its lowest energy state, while conserving overall flux. This is termed a Taylor state and inside the machine what is formed is a plasma structure named a spheromak. A dynomak is a kind of spheromak that is started and driven by externally induced magnetic fields.

== Technical roots ==
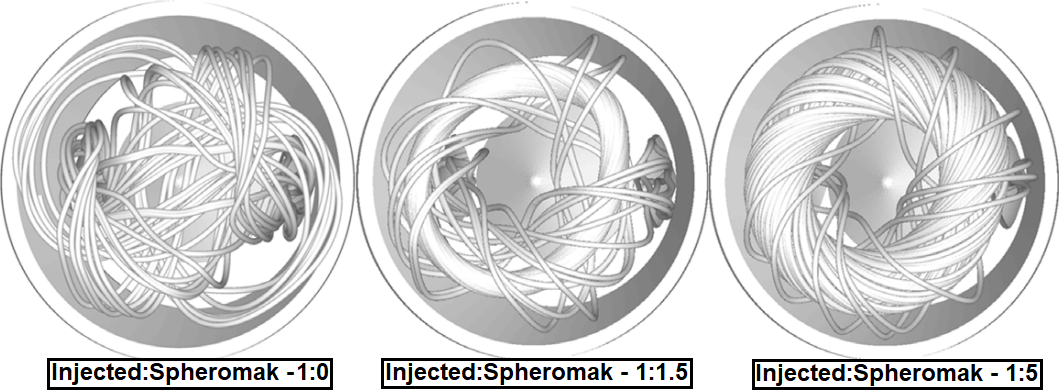
Spheromak formation

Plasma is a fluid that conducts electricity, which gives it the unique property that it can be self-structured into vortex rings (e.g., smoke ring like objects) which include field-reversed configurations and spheromaks. A structured plasma has the advantage that it is hotter, denser and more controllable which makes it a good choice for a fusion reactor. But forming these plasma structures has been challenging since the first structures were observed in 1959 because they are inherently unstable.

In 1974, Dr. John B Taylor proposed that a spheromak could be formed by inducing a magnetic flux into a loop plasma. The plasma would then relax naturally into a spheromak also termed a Taylor state. This process worked if the plasma:

- Conserved the total magnetic flux
- Minimized the total energy

Later, in 1979, these claims were checked by Marshall Rosenbluth. In 1974, Dr. Taylor could only use results from the ZETA pinch device to back up these claims. But, since then, Taylor states have been formed in multiple machines including:

- Compact Torus Experiment (CTX) at Los Alamos National Laboratory (LANL). The CTX ran from ~1979 to ~1987. It reached electron temperatures of 4.6 million kelvin ran for 3 microseconds and had a plasma to magnetic pressure ratio of 0.2.
- Sustained Spheromak Physics Experiment (SSPX) at Lawrence Livermore National Laboratory (LLNL) was a more advanced version of the CTX that was used to measure the relaxation process that led to a Taylor state. The machine ran from 1999 to 2007.
- Caltech Spheromak Experiment at California Institute of Technology (Caltech) was a small machine run by Dr. Paul Bellans’ lab, from ~2000 to ~2010.
- Helicity Injected Torus-Steady Inductive (HIT-SI) at the University of Washington was run by Dr. Jarboe from ~2004 to ~2012. It was the precursor to the dynomak. The machine created 90 kiloamps of stable plasma current over a few (<2) microseconds, and demonstrated the first Imposed-Dynamo Current Drive (IDCD) in 2011. The IDCD breakthrough enabled Dr. Jarboes’ group to envision the first reactor-scale version of this machine; named the dynomak.

The dynomak evolved from the HIT-SI experiment. HIT-SI went through several upgrades: the HIT-SI3 (~2013 to ~2020) and HIT-SIU (post ~2020), both were variants on the same machine. These machines demonstrated that an inductive current can be used to make and sustain a spheromak plasma structure.

== Magnetic induction drive ==
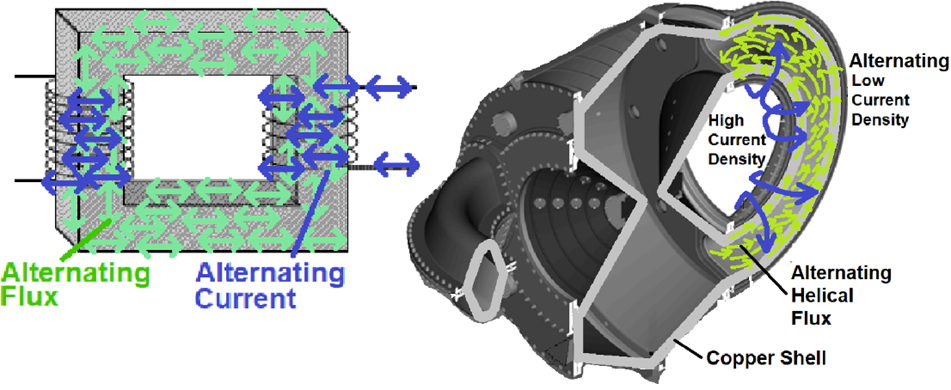
A comparison of a dynomak and an AC transformer shows how magnetic flux is needed to drive both machines.

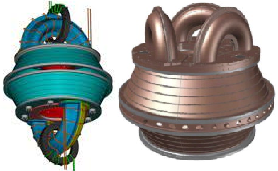
A comparison of the HIT-SI (left) and HIT-SI3 (right) shows different kinds and forms of flux injectors.

By definition, a dynomak is a plasma structure that is started, formed, and sustained using magnetic flux injection. Electric transformers use a similar process; a magnetic flux is created on the primary loop, and this makes an alternating current on the secondary side. Because of Faraday's law of induction, only a changing magnetic field can induce a secondary current – this is why a direct current transformer cannot exist. In a dynomak, magnetic induction is used to create a plasma current inside a plasma filled chamber. This gets the plasma moving and the system eventually relaxes into a Taylor state or spheromak. The relaxation process involves the flow of magnetic helicity (a twist in the field lines) from the injectors into the center of the machine.

Supporters of this heating approach have argued that induction is 2-3 orders of magnitude more efficient than radio frequency (RF) or neutral beam heating. If this is true, it gives a dynomak several distinct advantages over other fusion approaches like tokamaks or magnetic mirrors. But this is an open area of research; below are some examples of how effective inductive drive is in creating plasma current inside a dynomak.

Dynomak drive effectiveness
Induction power (megawatts)	Drive frequency (kHz)	Plasma current (kiloamps)	Machine	Year
3	5.8	12	HIT-SI	2006
6	14.7	38	HIT-SI	2011

A dynomak uses injectors, which are curved arms that are attached to the main chamber. An alternating current is applied around the curve of these arms, which creates the magnetic flux that drives a dynomak. The University of Washington experimented with two and three numbers of injectors. The phase of the alternating current is offset to allow continuous injection of flux into a dynomak. Injector count effects offset angle: The drive current, and thus injectors, are offset by 90 degrees with two injectors, and by 60 degrees with three injectors.

== Advantages ==
A spheromak plasma structure forms naturally, with no added technology needed. Supporters argue that this gives dynomaks several inherent advantages, including:

- It may avoid the kink, interchange, and other plasma instabilities that normally plague plasma structures. For this reason, a dynomak may be able to pressurize and heat a plasma up to the Mercer limit on beta number. If true, this could ultimately shrink a reactor relative to other fusion approaches.
- An inductive drive can be 2-3 orders of magnitude more efficient than heating via RF or neutral beam. This is an open area of research.
- A dynomak may need no added heating hardware such as neutral beam injection.
- A dynomak has no central solenoid, in contrast to a tokamak, lowering mass, cost, and operating power needs for a reactor.

As of 2014 plasma densities reached 5 × 10^{19} m^{−3}, temperatures of 60 eV, and maximum operation time of 1.5 ms. No confinement time results were available. At those temperatures, fusion, alpha heating, or neutron production do not occur.

== Commercialization ==
Once the technical principals were proven in the HIT-SI machine, Dr. Jarboe challenged his students in a University of Washington class to come up with a fusion reactor based on this approach. The students designed the dynomak as a reactor-level power plant that built on discoveries made from the HIT-SI and earlier machines.

CTFusion
- Industry: fusion power
- Predecessor: University of Washington
- Founded: 2015; 11 years ago
- Founders: Chris Ajemian; Aaron Hossack; Kyle Morgan; Derek Sutherland
- Defunct: 2023; 3 years ago
- Headquarters: Seattle, Washington, United States
- Number of employees: 10 (2023)

Eventually, these students formed CTFusion as a spin off from the University of Washington, to commercialize the dynomak in 2015. The firm has exclusive rights to 3 university patents and raised over $3.6 million from 2015 to 2019 in public and private funding. The acronym CT stands for compact toroid, which is what spheromaks were referred to for decades. The firm received funding as part of an Advanced Research Projects Agency – Energy (ARPA-E) funding award for fusion. CTFusion closed in 2023.

Unlike other fusion reactor designs (such as ITER), a dynomak can be, according to its engineering team, comparable in costs to a conventional coal plant. A dynomak is calculated to cost a tenth of ITER and produce five times more energy at an efficiency of 40 percent. A one gigawatt dynomak would cost US$2.7 billion compared to US$2.8 billion for a coal plant.

== Design ==
Dynomak incorporates an ITER-developed cryogenic pumping system. Spheromak use an oblate spheroid instead of a tokamak configuration, with no central core, or large, complex superconducting magnets as in many tokamaks, e.g., ITER. The magnetic fields are produced by putting electric fields into the center of the plasma using superconducting tapes wrapped around the vessel, such that the plasma contains itself.

A dynomak is smaller simpler and cheaper to build than a tokamak, such as ITER, while producing more power. The fusion reaction is self-sustaining as excess heat is drawn off by a molten salt blanket to power a steam turbine. The prototype was about one tenth the scale of a commercial project, and can sustain plasma efficiently. Higher output would require larger scale, and higher plasma temperature.

== Criticisms ==
A dynomak relies on a copper wall to conserve and direct the magnetic flux that is injected into the machine. This wall butts up against the plasma, creating the possibility of high conduction losses through the metal. The HIT-SI coated the inside of the copper wall with an aluminum-oxide insulator to reduce these losses, but this could still be a major loss mechanism if the machine goes to fusion reactor conditions.

Further, the injection of magnetic helicity into the field forces the machine to break the magnetic flux surfaces that hold and sustain the plasma structure. The breaking of these surfaces has been cited as a reason that a dynomaks' heating mechanism does not work as efficiently as predicted.

Lastly, a dynomak has a complex chamber geometry, which complicates and presents challenges for maintenance and vacuum forming.

== See also ==
- Spheromak
- Field-reversed configuration, a similar concept
- Spherical tokamak, essentially a spheromak formed around a central conductor–magnet
- Taylor state
- John Bryan Taylor
- List of nuclear fusion companies
