= Magneton =

Magneton may refer to:

- Bohr magneton, a physical constant of magnetic moment named after Niels Bohr
- Nuclear magneton, a physical constant of magnetic moment
- Parson magneton, a hypothetical object in atomic physics suggested by Alfred Lauck Parson in 1915
- Weiss magneton, an experimentally derived unit of magnetic moment suggested in 1911 by Pierre-Ernest Weiss
- Magneton, a term that some physicists use for magnetic monopole
- Magneton (Pokémon), a Pokémon species
- Magneton, an album by The Octagon Man

== See also ==
- Magnetron
