= Translation Confinement Sustainment experiment =

The Translation Confinement Sustainment experiment (TCS) was a plasma physics experiment at the University of Washington's Redmond Plasma Physics Laboratory from 2002 until 2009. The experiment studied magnetic plasma confinement to support controlled nuclear fusion experiments. Specifically, TCS pioneered the sustainment and heating of a Field-Reversed Configuration (FRC) by Rotating Magnetic Field (RMF).

The experiment was upgraded in 2006 to form the Translation Confinement Sustainment experiment -Upgraded (TCS-U).

== Background ==
FRCs are of interest to the plasma physics community because of their confinement properties and their small size. While most large fusion experiments in the world are tokamaks, FRCs are seen as a viable alternative because of their higher Beta, meaning the same power output could be produced from a smaller volume of plasma, and their good plasma stability.

== History ==
In the 1990s, the Large-S Experiment (LSX) had demonstrated that there exist kinetically stabilized regimes of operation in which FRC reactors could operate. However, the LSX used a method of forming FRCs called a theta-pinch, which does not allow FRCs to be further sustained and heated. The US Department of Energy funded the TCS program as an extension of LSX, in order to demonstrate the RMF method of sustaining FRCs formed via the theta-pinch method.

TCS was contemporary with other RMF-FRCs such as the STX, the PV Rotamak, and the PFRC.
