= Alfred Parsons =

Alfred Parsons may refer to:

- Alfred Parsons (diplomat)
- Alfred Parsons (artist)

== See also ==
- Alfred Lauck Parson, British chemist and physicist
