= Sustained Spheromak Physics Experiment =

Plasma experiment

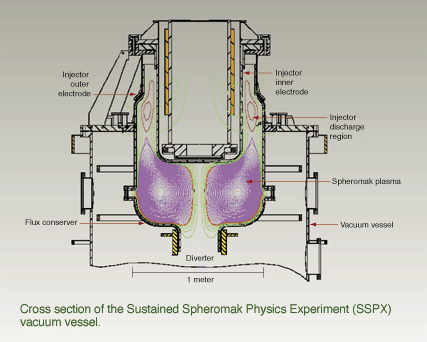
Cross section of the SSPX vacuum vessel

The Sustained Spheromak Physics Experiment (SSPX) is a program at Lawrence Livermore National Laboratory in the United States established to investigate spheromak plasma.

A spheromak device produces a plasma in magnetohydrodynamic equilibrium mainly through self-induced plasma currents, as opposed to a tokamak device which depends on large externally generated magnetic fields. The series of experiments examines the potential for a spheromak device to contain fusion fuel. According to a 1999 abstract,

The Sustained Spheromak Physics Experiment, SSPX, will study spheromak physics with particular attention to energy confinement and magnetic fluctuations in a spheromak sustained by electrostatic helicity injection.

== See also ==
- Magnetohydrodynamics
- Magnetic helicity
- Magnetic reconnection
- Turbulence
