= Marc Antoine Auguste Gaudin =

French chemist (1804–1880)

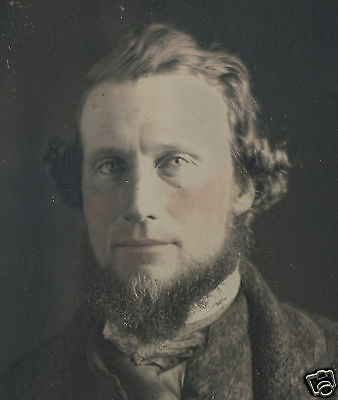
- Born: 5 April 1804
- Died: 2 August 1880 (aged 76)
- Scientific career
- Workplaces: Bureau des Longitudes

Marc Antoine Auguste Gaudin (5 April 1804 – 2 August 1880) was a French chemist.

He was a pioneer in photography and contributed to the Avogadro's gas law by proposing that some elements form diatomic or polyatomic gas.

== See also ==
- Corundum
- Gaudin Point
- History of molecular theory
- History of the camera
