= Taylor state =

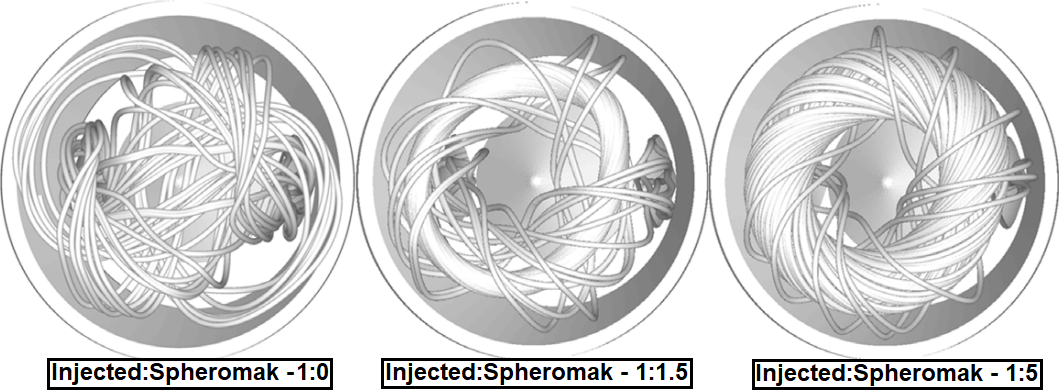
A comparison of different Taylor States inside the Dynomak.

In plasma physics, a Taylor state is the minimum energy state of a plasma while the plasma is conserving magnetic flux. This was first proposed by John Bryan Taylor in 1974 and he backed up this claim using data from the ZETA machine.

Taylor-States are critical to operating both the Dynomak and the reversed field pinch - both run in a Taylor State.

== Examples ==
In 1974, Dr. John B Taylor proposed that a spheromak could be formed by inducing a magnetic flux into a loop plasma. The plasma would then relax naturally into a spheromak also known as a Taylor State. This process worked if the plasma:

- Conserved the total magnetic flux
- Minimized the total energy

These claims were later checked by Marshall Rosenbluth in 1979. In 1974, Dr. Taylor could only use results from the ZETA pinch device to back up these claims. But, since then, Taylor states have been formed in multiple machines including:

- Compact Torus Experiment (CTX) at Los Alamos. The CTX operated from ~1979 to ~1987 at Los Alamos. It reached electron temperatures of 4.6 million kelvin ran for 3 microseconds and had a plasma to magnetic pressure ratio of 0.2.
- Sustained Spheromak Physics Experiment (SSPX) at Livermore was a more advanced version of the CTX that was used to measure the relaxation process that led to a Taylor state. The SSPX was working at Livermore from 1999 until 2007.
- Caltech Spheromak Experiment at Caltech was a small experiment run by Dr. Paul Bellans’ lab at Caltech from ~2000 to ~2010.
- Helicity Injected Torus-Steady Inductive (HIT-SI) at the University of Washington was run by Dr. Jarboe from 2004 to 2012 and was the precursor to the Dynomak. This machine created 90 kiloamps of stable plasma current over several (<2) microseconds. This machine also showed the first demonstration of Imposed-Dynamo Current Drive (IDCD) in 2011. The IDCD breakthrough enabled Dr. Jarboes’ group to envision the first reactor-scale version of this machine; called the Dynomak.

== Derivation ==
Consider a closed, simply-connected, flux-conserving, perfectly conducting surface $S$ surrounding a plasma with negligible thermal energy ($\beta \rightarrow 0$).

Since $\vec{B}\cdot\vec{ds}=0$ on $S$. This implies that $\vec{A}_{||}=0$.

As discussed above, the plasma would relax towards a minimum energy state while conserving its magnetic helicity. Since the boundary is perfectly conducting, there cannot be any change in the associated flux. This implies $\delta \vec{B}\cdot\vec{ds}=0$ and $\delta\vec{A}_{||}=0$ on $S$.

We formulate a variational problem of minimizing the plasma energy $W=\int d^3rB^2/2\mu_\circ$ while conserving magnetic helicity $K=\int d^3r\vec{A}\cdot\vec{B}$.

The variational problem is $\delta W -\lambda \delta K = 0$.

After some algebra this leads to the following constraint for the minimum energy state $\nabla \times \vec{B} = \lambda \vec{B}$.
