= Trisops =

Trisops (acronym of Thermonuclear Reactor In Support of Project Sherwood) was an experimental machine for the study of magnetic confinement of plasmas with the ultimate goal of producing fusion power. The configuration was a variation of a compact toroid, a toroidal (doughnut-shaped) structure of plasma and magnetic fields with no electromagnetic coils or electrodes penetrating the center. It lost funding in its original form in 1978.

The configuration is produced by combining two individual toroids produced by two conical θ pinch guns, located at either end of a length of Pyrex pipe with a constant guide magnetic field. The toroidal currents in the toroids are in opposite directions, so that they repel each other. After coming to an equilibrium, they are compressed adiabatically by increasing the external field.

== Force free plasma vortices ==
Force free plasma vortices have uniform magnetic helicity and therefore are stable against many instabilities. Typically, the current decays faster in the colder regions until the gradient in helicity is large enough to allow a turbulent redistribution of the current.

Force free vortices follow these equations:

$$\begin{align}
\vec{\nabla} \times \vec{B} = \alpha\vec{B} \\
\vec{v} = \pm\beta\vec{B}
\end{align}$$

The first equation describes a Lorentz force-free fluid: the $\vec{j} \times \vec{B}$ forces are everywhere zero. For a laboratory plasma α is a constant and β is a scalar function of spatial coordinates.

The magnetic flux surfaces are toroidal, with the current being totally toroidal at the core of the torus and totally poloidal at the surface of the torus. This is similar to the field configuration of a tokamak, except that the field-producing coils are simpler and do not penetrate the plasma torus.

Unlike most plasma structures, the Lorentz force and the Magnus force, $\rho\vec{\nabla} \times \vec{v}$, play equivalent roles. $\rho$ is the mass density.

== Project ==
Dr. Daniel Wells, while working on the Stellarator at the Princeton Plasma Physics Laboratory in the 1960s conceived of colliding and then compressing stable force free plasma toroids to produce conditions needed for thermonuclear fusion. He named the concept in support of Project Sherwood. He later moved to the University of Miami where he set up the Trisops machine, supported by the National Science Foundation and Florida Power and Light.

The project continued until 1978, when the National Science Foundation (NSF) discontinued the grant and the United States Department of Energy (DOE) did not pick up the support.

== Machine ==
Schematic diagram of Trisops machine used for creation and secondary compression of plasma vortex structures. Machine length is about 2m.

The fourth and final version of the Trisops machine consisted of DC mirror coils producing a 0.5 T guide field, two conical θ-pinch guns which produced two counter-rotating plasma vortices inside a pyrex vacuum chamber. The vortices approached each other, collided, repelled each other, and finally came to rest. At that time the compression coils produced a 3.5 T field with a quarter-cycle rise time of 10 μs.

== Results ==
The compressed rings retained their structure for 5 μs, with a density of 2 × 10^{17} cm^{−3}, an ion temperature of 5 keV, an electron temperature of 300 eV. Defunding prevented further measurements to resolve the discrepancy between the above figures, and the plasma electron-ion temperature equilibration time of 1 μs.

== Followup ==
The project lost funding in 1978. The machine was disassembled and remained at the University of Miami until 1997. Then, the machine was moved to Lanham, Maryland and reassembled for the CMTX project (see reference). As of 2024, the status of the project and the machine are unknown.
