= Princeton field-reversed configuration =

Plasma experiments

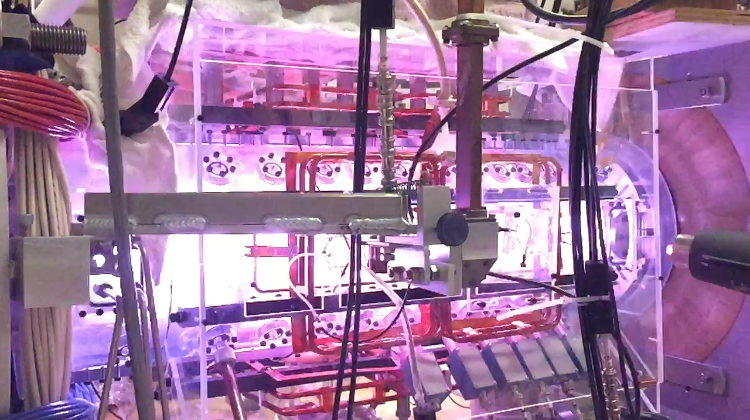
One rotating magnetic field pulse of the PFRC-2 device during an experiment

The Princeton Field Reversed Configuration (PFRC) is a series of experiments in plasma physics, an experimental program to evaluate a configuration for a fusion power reactor, at the Princeton Plasma Physics Laboratory (PPPL). The experiment probes the dynamics of long-pulse, collisionless, low s-parameter field-reversed configurations (FRCs) formed with odd-parity rotating magnetic fields. FRCs are the evolution of the Greek engineer's Nicholas C. Christofilos original idea of E-layers which he developed for the Astron fusion reactor. The PFRC program aims to experimentally verify the physics predictions that such configurations are globally stable and have transport levels comparable with classical magnetic diffusion. It also aims to apply this technology to the Direct Fusion Drive concept for spacecraft propulsion.

== History ==
The PFRC was initially funded by the United States Department of Energy. Early in its operation it was contemporary with such RMF-FRCs as the Translation Confinement Sustainment experiment (TCS) and the Prairie View Rotamak (PV Rotamak).

At PPPL, the experiment PFRC-1 ran from 2008 through 2011. PFRC-2 is running as of 2023. PFRC-3 is scheduled next. PFRC-4 is scheduled for the late-2020s.

As of 2023 fusion had not been achieved.

== Experiments and results ==
The PFRC-1 and PFRC-2 experiments have heated electrons to energies in excess of 100 eV and plasma durations to 300 ms, more than 10^{4} times longer than the predicted tilt instability growth time.

=== PFRC-1 ===
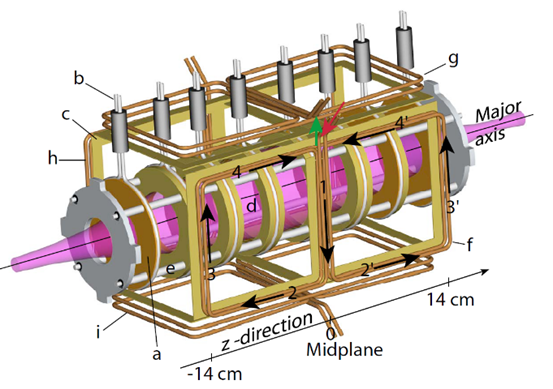
Above is one design of the PFRC Antenna and magnetic design from 2011.

=== PFRC-2 ===
PFRC-2 experimental results
Parameter	Value
Pulse length	300 ms
Magnetic field strength	to 350 G (vacuum )
RMF Frequency	2-14 MHz
RMF Power	to 200 kW
RMF Coupling	60%
Plasma temperature	100 eV e- at 4.3 MHz
Plasma radius	8 cm
Electron density	10^{13} /cc
Gas	H_{2}, He, Ne, Ar
Excluded flux	0.6 mVs
Energy confinement time	5 × 10^{−5} s

== Odd-parity rotating magnetic field ==
The electric current that forms the field-reversed configuration (FRC) in the PFRC is driven by a rotating magnetic field (RMF). This method has been well-studied and produced favorable results in the Rotamak series of experiments. However, rotating magnetic fields as applied in these and other experiments (so-called even parity RMFs) induce opening of the magnetic field lines. When a transverse magnetic field is applied to the axisymmetric equilibrium FRC magnetic field, rather than magnetic field lines closing on themselves and forming a closed region, they spiral around in the azimuthal direction and ultimately cross the separatrix surface which contains the closed FRC region.

One rotating magnetic field pulse of the PFRC-2 device during an experiment, in slow motion

The PFRC uses RMF antennae that produce a magnetic field which flips direction about a symmetry plane oriented with its normal along the axis, half-way along the length of the axis of the machine. This configuration is called an odd parity rotating magnetic field (RMF_{o}). Such magnetic fields, when added in small magnitude to axisymmetric equilibrium magnetic fields, do not cause opening of the magnetic field lines and overall topology is preserved. The critical threshold magnitude of 'odd parity' rotating magnetic field which opens up the axisymmetric equilibrium magnetic field lines and fundamentally changes field topology is rather high. Thus, the RMF is not expected to contribute to transport of particles and energy out of the core of the PFRC.

== Low s-parameter ==
In an FRC, the name s-parameter is given to the ratio of the distance between the magnetic null and the separatrix, and the thermal ion Larmor radius. That is how many ion orbits can fit between the core of the FRC and where it meets the bulk plasma. A high-s FRC would have very small ion gyroradii compared to the size of the machine. Thus, at high s-parameter, the model of magnetohydrodynamics (MHD) applies. MHD predicts that the FRC is unstable to the "n=1 tilt mode," in which the reversed field tilts 180 degrees to align with the applied magnetic field, destroying the FRC.

A low-s FRC is predicted to be stable to the tilt mode. An s-parameter less than or equal to 2 is sufficient for this effect. However, only two ion radii between the hot core and the cool bulk means that on average only two scattering periods (velocity changes of on average 90 degrees) are sufficient to remove a hot, fusion-relevant ion from the core of the plasma. Thus the choice is between high s-parameter ions that are classically well confined but convectively poorly confined, and low s-parameter ions that are classically poorly confined but convectively well confined.

The PFRC has an s-parameter between 1 and 2. Stabilizing the tilt-mode is predicted to aid confinement more than the small number of tolerable collisions will hurt confinement.

== Spacecraft propulsion ==
Scientists from Princeton Satellite Systems are working on a new concept called Direct Fusion Drive (DFD) that is based on the PFRC but has one open end through which exhaust flows to generate thrust. It would produce electric power and propulsion from a single compact fusion reactor. The first concept study and modeling (Phase I NASA NIAC) was published in 2017, and was proposed to power the propulsion system of a Pluto orbiter and lander. Adding propellant to the cool plasma flow results in a variable thrust when channeled through a magnetic nozzle. Modeling suggests that the DFD might produce 5 Newtons of thrust per each megawatt of generated fusion power. About 35% of the fusion power goes to thrust, 30% to electric power, 25% lost to heat, and 10% is recirculated for the radio frequency (RF) heating. The concept was awarded a Phase II to further advance the design and shielding.
