= David L. Webster =

American physicist (1888–1976)

David Locke Webster
- Born: November 6, 1888; Boston, Massachusetts, U.S.
- Died: December 17, 1976 (aged 88); Palo Alto, California, U.S.
- Education: Harvard University
- Known for: X-ray theory ultra-high frequency radio waves rocket science
- Scientific career
- Fields: Physicist
- Workplaces: Harvard University; Massachusetts Institute of Technology; Stanford University

David Locke Webster (November 6, 1888 – December 17, 1976) was an American physicist and physics professor, whose early research on X-rays and Parson's magneton influenced Arthur Compton.

== Biography ==
David Locke Webster was born November 6, 1888, in Boston, Massachusetts, to Andrew Gerrish Webster and Elizabeth Florence Briggs. He attended Harvard University, earning an A.B. in 1910 and a Ph.D. in physics in 1913. His teaching career began at Harvard as a mathematics instructor, 1910–1911; physics assistant, 1911–15; and physics instructor, 1915–1917, during which time he published several papers on X-ray theory. This work continued while served as a physics instructor at the nearby Massachusetts Institute of Technology from 1919 to 1920. He acted a professor of physics at Stanford University from 1920 until his retirement in 1954, when he was awarded professor emeritus status. Webster was a member of the National Academy of Sciences, the American Academy of Arts and Sciences, the American Philosophical Society, the American Physical Society and the American Geophysical Union. A member of the American Association of Physics Teachers from its inception in 1930, Webster served as its Vice-President in 1933 and 1934 and as President in 1935 and 1936. During World War II, Webster served as head physicist in the United States Army Signal Corps (1942), chief physicist in the Ordnance Department (1942–45), and consultant to these units after 1945. Webster died December 17, 1976.

== Bibliography ==
=== Books ===
- David L. Webster, General Physics for Colleges (Century, 1923).

=== Scientific papers ===
- Webster DL (Sep 1914). "The Effect of Pressure on the Absorption of Light by Bromine and Chlorine, and its Theoretical Significance". Physical Review. 4 (3): 177–194, 561. Bibcode:1914PhRv....4..177W. doi:10.1103/PhysRev.4.177.
- Webster DL (Mar 1915). "The Intensities of X-Ray Spectra". Physical Review. 5 (3): 238–243. Bibcode:1915PhRv....5..238W. doi:10.1103/PhysRev.5.238.
- Webster DL (Feb 1916). "The Emission Quanta of Characteristic X Rays". Proceedings of the National Academy of Sciences of the United States of America. 2 (2): 90–4. Bibcode:1916PNAS....2...90W. doi:10.1073/pnas.2.2.90. PMC 1090951. PMID 16576119.
- Webster DL (Jun 1916). "Experiments on the Emission Quanta of Characteristic X-Rays". Physical Review. 7 (6): 599–613. Bibcode:1916PhRv....7..599W. doi:10.1103/PhysRev.7.599.
- Webster DL (Jul 1916). "Notes on Page's Theory of Heat Radiation". Physical Review. 8 (1): 66–69. Bibcode:1916PhRv....8...66W. doi:10.1103/PhysRev.8.66.
- Webster DL, Clark H (Nov 1916). "A Test for X-Ray Refraction Made with Monochromatic Rays". Physical Review. 8 (5): 528–533. Bibcode:1916PhRv....8..528W. doi:10.1103/PhysRev.8.528.
- Webster DL, Clark H (Mar 1917). "The Intensities of X-Rays of the L Series". Proceedings of the National Academy of Sciences of the United States of America. 3 (3): 181–5. Bibcode:1917PNAS....3..181W. doi:10.1073/pnas.3.3.181. PMC 1091204. PMID 16576211.
- Webster DL (Mar 1917). "X-Ray Emissivity as a Function of Cathode Potential". Physical Review. 9 (3): 220–225. Bibcode:1917PhRv....9..220W. doi:10.1103/PhysRev.9.220.
- Webster DL (Jun 1917). "The Theory of Electromagnetic Mass of the Parson Magneton and other Non-Spherical Systems". Physical Review. 9 (6): 484–499. Bibcode:1917PhRv....9..484W. doi:10.1103/PhysRev.9.484.
- Webster DL (Aug 1917). "Equations as Statements About Things". Science. 46 (1182): 187–189. Bibcode:1917Sci....46..187W. doi:10.1126/science.46.1182.187. PMID 17807530.
- David L. Webster, "The Scattering of Alpha Rays as Evidence on the Parson Magnetron Hypothesis", Physical Review (Feb 1918).
- Webster DL (May 1920). "An Improved Form of High Tension D. C. Apparatus". Proceedings of the National Academy of Sciences of the United States of America. 6 (5): 269–72. Bibcode:1920PNAS....6..269W. doi:10.1073/pnas.6.5.269. PMC 1084502. PMID 16586812.
- David L. Webster, "The Physics of Flight", (May 1920).
- Webster DL (Jul 1920). "Quantum Emission Phenomena in Radiation". Physical Review. 16 (1): 31–40. Bibcode:1920PhRv...16...31W. doi:10.1103/PhysRev.16.31.
- David L. Webster, "The Present Conception of Atomic Structure", (Jul 1921).
- David L. Webster, "A General Survey of the Present Status of the Atomic Structure Problem", (Jul 1921).
- David L. Webster, "Note on the Masses of Stars", (Jan 1922).
- Webster DL (Oct 1923). "The American Physical Society" (PDF). Science. 58 (1504): 336. Bibcode:1923Sci....58..336W. doi:10.1126/science.58.1504.336. PMID 17798762. S2CID 7488646. Archived from the original (PDF) on 2020-02-19.
- Webster DL (May 1924). "A Possible Explanation of Tertiary Line Spectra in X-Rays". Proceedings of the National Academy of Sciences of the United States of America. 10 (5): 186–91. Bibcode:1924PNAS...10..186W. doi:10.1073/pnas.10.5.186. PMC 1085591. PMID 16576815.
- Ross PA, Webster DL (Jan 1925). "The Compton Effect with No Box around the Tube". Proceedings of the National Academy of Sciences of the United States of America. 11 (1): 56–61. Bibcode:1925PNAS...11...56R. doi:10.1073/pnas.11.1.56. PMC 1085831. PMID 16586969.
- Ross PA, Webster DL (Jan 1925). "Compton Effect: Evidence on Its Relation to Duane's Box Effect". Proceedings of the National Academy of Sciences of the United States of America. 11 (1): 61–4. Bibcode:1925PNAS...11...61R. doi:10.1073/pnas.11.1.61. PMC 1085832. PMID 16586970.
- Webster DL, Ross PA (Apr 1925). "The Compton Effect with Hard X-Rays". Proceedings of the National Academy of Sciences of the United States of America. 11 (4): 224–7. Bibcode:1925PNAS...11..224W. doi:10.1073/pnas.11.4.224. PMC 1085927. PMID 16576877.
- Webster DL (Jun 1927). "Direct and Indirect Production of Characteristic X-Rays". Proceedings of the National Academy of Sciences of the United States of America. 13 (6): 445–56. Bibcode:1927PNAS...13..445W. doi:10.1073/pnas.13.6.445. PMC 1085034. PMID 16587195.
- Webster DL (Apr 1928). "Direct and Indirect Characteristic X-Rays: Their Ratio as a Function of Cathode-Ray Energy". Proceedings of the National Academy of Sciences of the United States of America. 14 (4): 330–9. Bibcode:1928PNAS...14..330W. doi:10.1073/pnas.14.4.330. PMC 1085487. PMID 16587344.
- Webster DL (Apr 1928). "K-Electron Ionization by Direct Impact of Cathode Rays". Proceedings of the National Academy of Sciences of the United States of America. 14 (4): 339–44. Bibcode:1928PNAS...14..339W. doi:10.1073/pnas.14.4.339. PMC 1085488. PMID 16587345.
- Webster DL, Clark H, Yeatman RM, Hansen WW (Sep 1928). "Intensities of K-Series X-Rays from Thin Targets". Proceedings of the National Academy of Sciences of the United States of America. 14 (9): 679–86. Bibcode:1928PNAS...14..679W. doi:10.1073/pnas.14.9.679. PMC 1085680. PMID 16587389.
- Webster DL (Mar 1934). "Current Progress in X-Ray Physics". Science. 79 (2044): 191–197. Bibcode:1934Sci....79..191W. doi:10.1126/science.79.2044.191. PMID 17792026.
- Webster DL (Aug 1939). "Surface Currents in Deep Tidal Waters". Science. 90 (2327): 107–108. Bibcode:1939Sci....90..107W. doi:10.1126/science.90.2327.107. PMID 17810652.
- Webster DL (Dec 1940). "Perceptual Disorientation During Landing of Airplane". Science. 92 (2400): 603–604. Bibcode:1940Sci....92..603W. doi:10.1126/science.92.2400.603. PMID 17795440.
- David L. Webster, "Forces on Ferromagnets through which Electrons are Moving", (Dec 1946).
- Leonard T. Pockman; David L. Webster; Paul Kirkpatrick; Keith Harworth (Mar 1947). "The Probability of K Ionization of Nickel by Electrons as a Function of Their Energy". Physical Review. 71 (6): 330–338. Bibcode:1947PhRv...71..330P. doi:10.1103/PhysRev.71.330.
- Webster DL; Newton, Carol (Jun 1956). "Masses of Carriers in Conductors". Physical Review. 82 (6): 808–8091. Bibcode:1951PhRv...82..808W. doi:10.1103/PhysRev.82.808.
