= Archibald Scott Couper =

Scottish chemist (1831–1892)

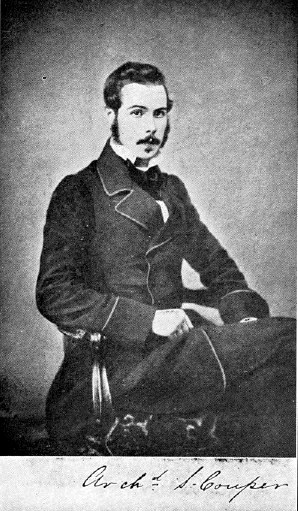
- Archibald Scott Couper
- Born: 31 March 1831; Kirkintilloch, Scotland
- Died: 11 March 1892 (aged 60); Kirkintilloch, Scotland
- Education: University of Paris

Archibald Scott Couper (/ˈkuːpər/; 31 March 1831 – 11 March 1892) was a Scottish chemist who proposed an early theory of chemical structure and bonding. He developed the concepts of tetravalent carbon atoms linking together to form large molecules, and that the bonding order of the atoms in a molecule can be determined from chemical evidence.

== Life and work ==
Couper was the only surviving son of a wealthy textile mill owner near Glasgow. He studied at the universities of Glasgow and Edinburgh and intermittently in Germany during the years 1851–54. He began the formal study of chemistry at the University of Berlin in the autumn of 1854, then in 1856 entered Charles Adolphe Wurtz's private laboratory at the Faculty of Medicine in Paris (now the University of Paris V: René Descartes).

Couper published his "New Chemical Theory" in French in a condensed form on 14 June 1858, then in detailed papers simultaneously in French and English in August 1858. Couper's idea that carbon atoms can link to each other following valence regularities was independent of a paper by August Kekulé proposing the same concept. (Kekulé had already proposed the tetravalence of carbon in 1857.) However, through a misunderstanding with Wurtz, Kekulé's paper appeared in print first, in May 1858, and so Kekulé captured the priority for the discovery of the self-linking of carbon atoms. When Couper angrily confronted Wurtz, Wurtz expelled him from the laboratory.

In December 1858, Couper received an offer of an assistantship from the University of Edinburgh. However, Couper's health began to decline after his disappointment. In May 1859 he suffered a nervous breakdown, and entered an institution as a private patient. Released in July 1859, he almost immediately suffered a relapse—it was said to have been from sunstroke—and was treated again until November 1862. But his health was now broken, and he did no more serious work, spending the last 30 years of his life in the care of his mother.

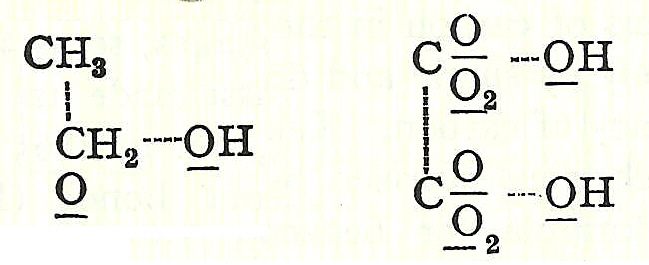
Archibald Couper's molecular structures, for alcohol and oxalic acid, using elemental symbols for atoms and lines for bonds (1858)

Couper's research differed from Kekulé's in several ways. He was open to the idea of divalent carbon, which Kekulé was not. He provided many more resolved formulas in his paper than Kekulé had, and in two cases even suggested (hetero)cyclical formulas, which could have influenced Kekulé in his later suggestion of the benzene ring. Couper adopted the atomic weight of oxygen as 8 rather than 16, so there are twice as many oxygen atoms in Couper's formulas as in those of Kekulé. Finally, Couper used dotted lines or dashes between the atoms in his formulas, approximating the appearance of later formula styles. In this respect, his work was probably influential on the early structural theorists Aleksandr Butlerov and Alexander Crum Brown.

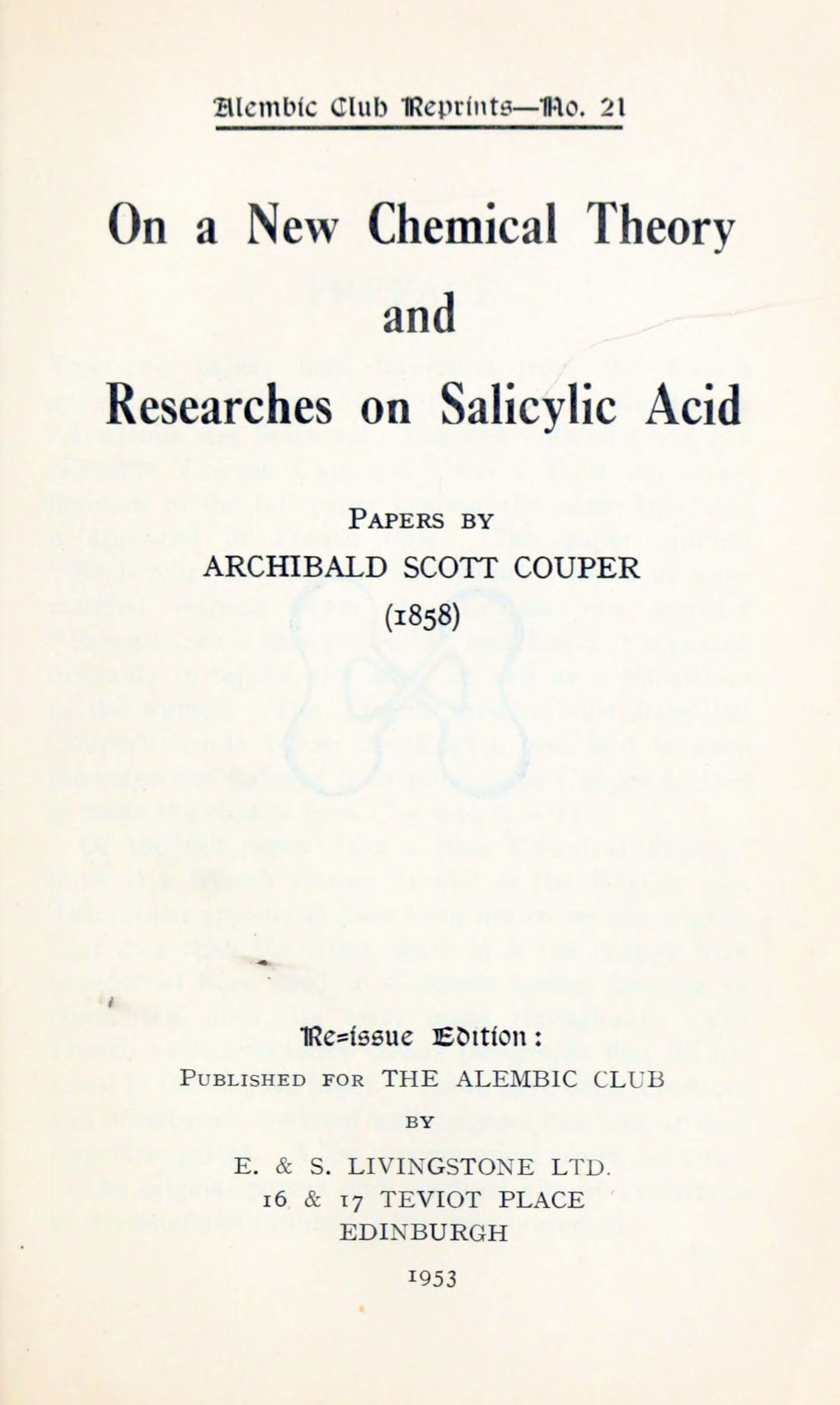
On a new chemical theory and researches on salicylic acid, 1953

== See also ==
- History of the molecule
