= Direct Fusion Drive =

Conceptual rocket engine

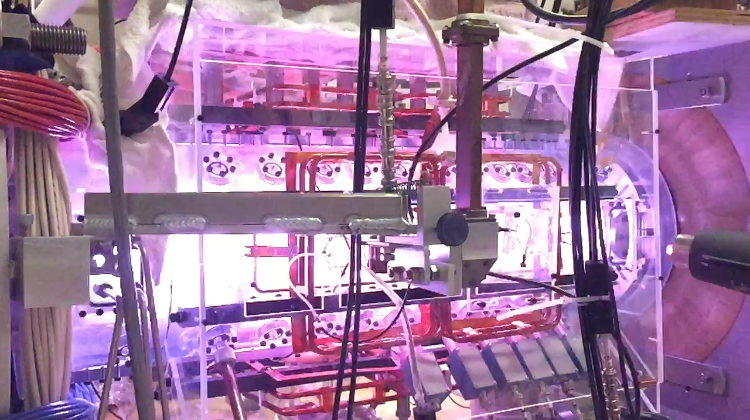
One rotating magnetic field pulse of the Princeton field-reversed configuration (PFRC 2) device during testing

Direct Fusion Drive (DFD) is a conceptual, low radioactivity, nuclear-fusion rocket engine, designed to produce both thrust and electric power, suitable for interplanetary spacecraft. The concept is based on the Princeton field-reversed configuration reactor, invented in 2002 by Samuel A. Cohen. It is being modeled and experimentally tested at Princeton Plasma Physics Laboratory, a U.S. Department of Energy facility, as well as modeled and evaluated by Princeton Satellite Systems (PSS). As of 2018, a direct fusion drive project driven by NASA is said to have entered its simulation phase, presented as the second phase of the concept's evolution.

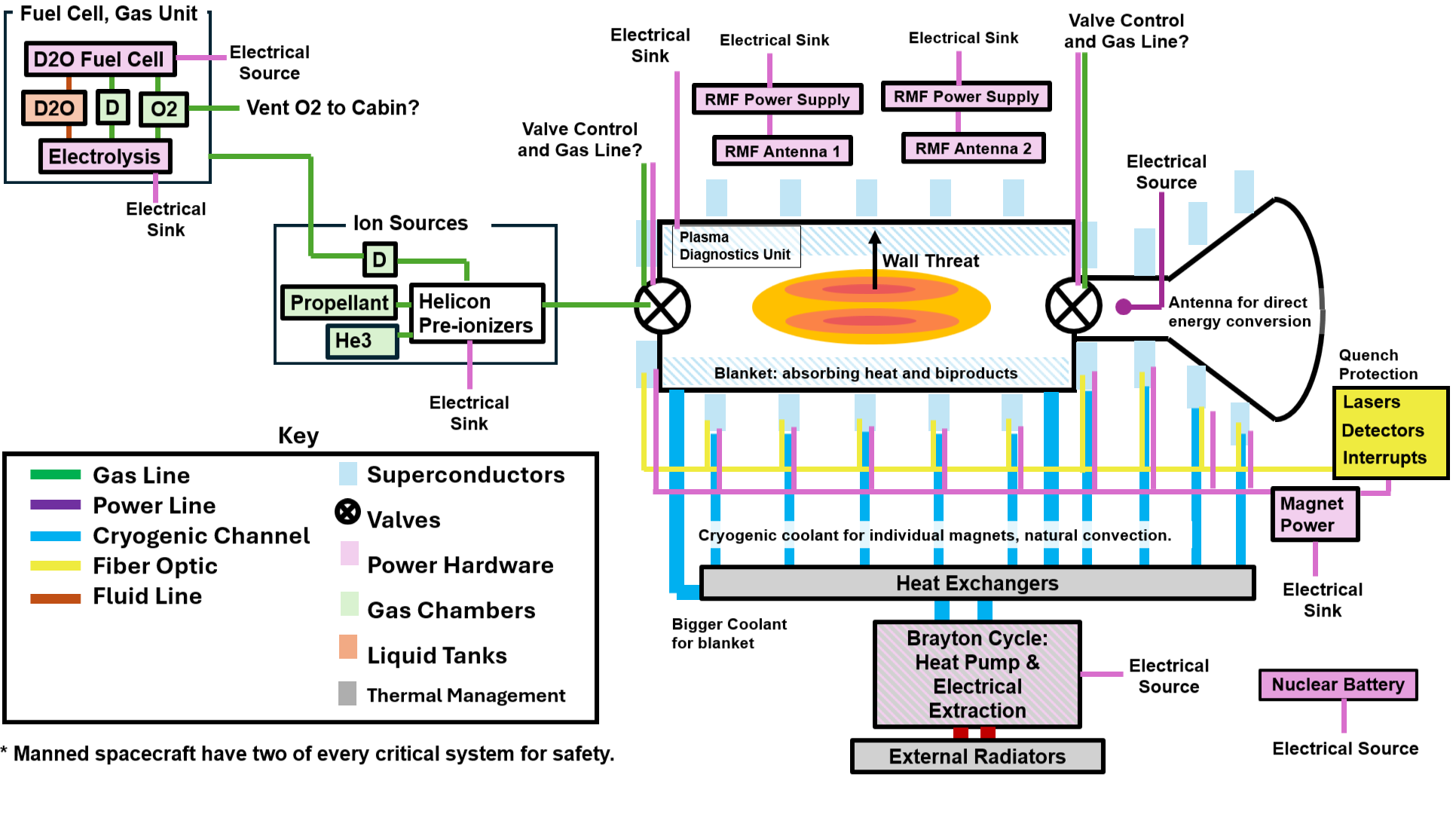
This is a schematic of the direct fusion drive.

== Principle ==
The Direct Fusion Drive (DFD) is a theoretical spacecraft propulsion system that derives its name from its unique capability to generate thrust directly from nuclear fusion, bypassing the need for an intermediate electricity-generating process. Using a magnetic confinement and heating mechanism, the DFD is powered by a blend of helium-3 (3He) and deuterium (D or 2H), resulting in a propulsion system characterized by high specific power, variable thrust, specific impulse, and minimal radiation emissions of spacecraft propulsion system.

In the DFD, plasma, a collection of electrically charged particles that includes electrons and ions, fuse together at high temperatures (100 keV), releasing enormous amounts of energy. The plasma is confined in a torus-like magnetic field inside of a linear solenoidal coil and is heated by a rotating magnetic field to relevant fusion temperatures. Bremsstrahlung and synchrotron radiation emitted from the plasma are captured and converted to electricity for communications, spacecraft station-keeping, and maintaining the plasma's temperature. This design uses a specially shaped radio frequency (RF) "antenna" to heat the plasma. The design includes a rechargeable battery or a deuterium-oxygen auxiliary power unit to start up or restart the unit.

The captured radiated energy heats a He-Xe fluid that flows outside the plasma to 1,500 K (1,230 °C; 2,240 °F) in a boron-containing structure. That energy is put through a closed-loop Brayton cycle generator to transform it into electricity for use in energizing the coils, powering the RF heater, charging the battery, communications, and station-keeping functions.

=== Thrust generation ===
Adding propellant to the edge plasma flow results in a variable thrust and specific impulse when channeled and accelerated through a magnetic nozzle; this flow of momentum past the nozzle is predominantly carried by the ions as they expand through the magnetic nozzle and beyond, and thus, function as an ion thruster.

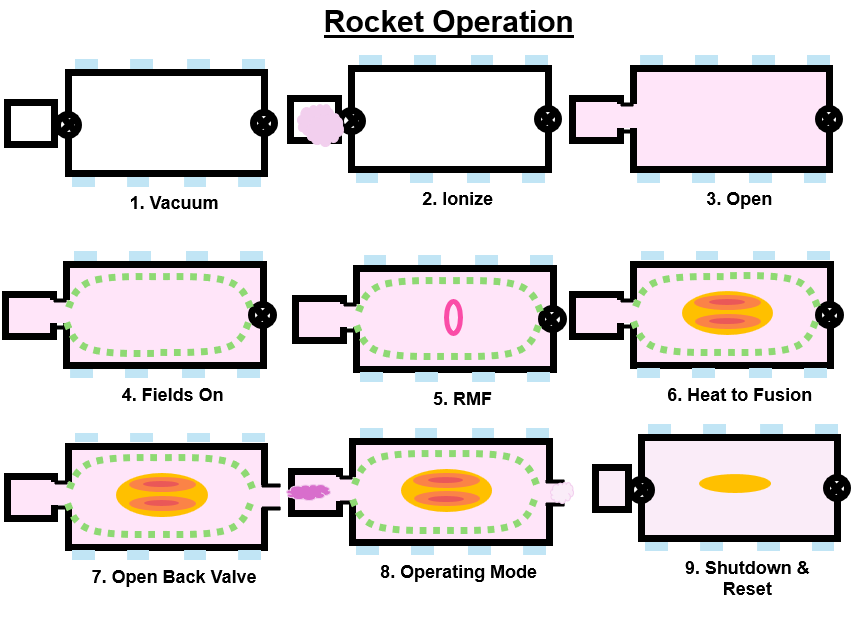
The 9 steps of the Direct Fusion Drive.

== Development ==
The construction of the experimental research device and most of its early operations were funded by the U.S. Department of Energy. The recent studies—Phase I and Phase II—were funded by the NASA Institute for Advanced Concepts (NIAC) program. A series of articles on the concept were published between 2001 and 2008; the first experimental results were reported in 2007. Numerous studies of spacecraft missions (Phase I) were published, beginning in 2012. In 2017 Princeton Satellite Systems reported that "Studies of electron heating with this method have surpassed theoretical predictions, and experiments to measure ion heating in the second-generation machine are ongoing."

As of 2018, the concept has moved to Phase II, a simulation phase. The full-size unit would measure approximately 2 m in diameter and 10 m in length.

Stephanie Thomas is vice president of Princeton Satellite Systems and the principal investigator for the Direct Fusion Drive.

== Projected performance ==
Princeton Satellite Systems estimate that the Direct Fusion Drive may be capable of producing between 5–10 Newtons thrust per each MW of generated fusion power, with a specific impulse (I_{sp}) of about 10,000 seconds and 200 kW available as electrical power. Approximately 35% of the fusion power goes to thrust, 30% to electric power, 25% lost to heat, and 10% is recirculated for the RF heating.

The company's modeling shows that this technology could propel a spacecraft with a mass of about 1,000 kg (2,200 lb) to Pluto in four years, enabling deep space missions. DFD generates extra power so it may provide approximately 2 MW of power to the payloads upon arrival. This allows more options for instrument selection and laser/optical communications, and could even transfer up to 50 KW of power from the orbiter to the lander through a laser beam operating at 1080 nm wavelength.

Princeton Satellite Systems says that this technology can expand the scientific capability of planetary missions. This power/propulsion technology has been suggested to be used on a Pluto orbiter and lander mission, or as integration on the Orion spacecraft to transport a crewed mission to Mars in a faster time frame (4 months instead of 9 with current technology). DFD is projected to deliver scientific payloads to Titan in 2.6 years.

== See also ==
- Fusion Industry Association
- Pulsar Fusion
