= Field-reversed configuration =

Magnetic confinement fusion reactor

Field-reversed configuration: a toroidal electric current is induced inside a cylindrical plasma, making a poloidal magnetic field, reversed in respect to the direction of an externally applied magnetic field. The resultant high-beta axisymmetric compact toroid is self-confined.

A field-reversed configuration (FRC) is a type of plasma device studied as a means of producing nuclear fusion. It confines a plasma on closed magnetic field lines without a central penetration. In an FRC, the plasma has the form of a self-stable torus, similar to a smoke ring.

FRCs are closely related to another self-stable magnetic confinement fusion device, the spheromak. Both are members of a class of fusion devices based on different types of toroidal plasma configurations that are self-stable, termed compact toroids, which in turn are a type of plasmoid. The plasma of an FRC versus a spheromak is usually more elongated, having an overall shape of a hollow sausage rather than a roughly spherical spheromak.

FRCs were a major area of research in the 1960s and into the 1970s, but had problems scaling up into practical fusion triple products (target combinations of density, temperature and confinement time). Interest returned in the 1990s and as of 2019, FRCs were an active research area.

== History ==
The FRC was first observed in laboratories in the late 1950s during theta pinch experiments with a reversed background magnetic field. The original idea was attributed to the Greek scientist and engineer Nicholas C. Christofilos who developed the concept of E-layers for the Astron fusion reactor.

The first studies were at the United States Naval Research Laboratory (NRL) in the 1960s. Considerable data were collected, with over 600 published papers. Almost all research was conducted during Project Sherwood at Los Alamos National Laboratory (LANL) from 1975 to 1990, and during 18 years at the Redmond Plasma Physics Laboratory of the University of Washington, with the large s experiment (LSX).

Later research was at the Air Force Research Laboratory (AFRL), the Fusion Technology Institute (FTI) of the University of Wisconsin-Madison, Princeton Plasma Physics Laboratory, and the University of California, Irvine.

Private companies now study FRCs for electricity generation, including General Fusion, TAE Technologies, and Helion Energy.

The Electrodeless Lorentz Force Thruster (ELF) developed by MSNW was an attempt to design a space propulsion device. ELF was a candidate in NASA's NextSTEP advanced electric propulsion program, along with the X-3 Nested-Channel Hall Thruster and VASIMR before MSNW dissolved.

== Applications ==
The primary application is for fusion power generation.

The FRC is also considered for deep space exploration, not only as a possible nuclear energy source, but as means of accelerating a propellant to high levels of specific impulse (I_{sp}) for electrically powered spaceships and fusion rockets, with interest expressed by NASA.

== Comparisons ==
The Difference Between an FRC and a Spheromak

Producing fusion power by confining the plasma with magnetic fields is most effective if the field lines do not penetrate solid surfaces but close on themselves into circles or toroidal surfaces. The mainline confinement concepts of tokamak and stellarator do this in a toroidal chamber, which allows a great deal of control over the magnetic configuration, but requires a very complex construction. The field-reversed configuration offers an alternative in that the field lines are closed, providing good confinement, but the chamber is cylindrical, allowing simpler, easier construction and maintenance.

Field-reversed configurations and spheromaks are together known as compact toroids. Spheromaks and FRC differ in that a spheromak has an extra toroidal field. This toroidal field can run along the same or opposite direction as the spinning plasma. In the spheromak the strength of the toroidal magnetic field is similar to that of the poloidal field. By contrast, the FRC has little to no toroidal field component and is confined solely by a poloidal field. The lack of a toroidal field means that the FRC has no magnetic helicity and that it has a high beta. The high beta makes the FRC attractive as a fusion reactor and well-suited to aneutronic fuels because of the low required magnetic field. Spheromaks have β ≈ 0.1 whereas a typical FRC has β ≈ 1.

== Formation ==
The Dimensions of an FRC, including the S-parameter

In modern FRC experiments, the plasma current that reverses the magnetic field can be induced in a variety of ways.

When a field-reversed configuration is formed using the theta-pinch (or inductive electric field) method, a cylindrical coil first produces an axial magnetic field. Then the gas is pre-ionized, which "freezes in" the bias field from a magnetohydrodynamic standpoint, finally the axial field is reversed, hence "field-reversed configuration." At the ends, reconnection of the bias field and the main field occurs, producing closed field lines. The main field is raised further, compressing and heating the plasma and providing a vacuum field between the plasma and the wall.

Neutral beams are known to drive current in Tokamaks by directly injecting charged particles. FRCs can also be formed, sustained, and heated by application of neutral beams. In such experiments, as above, a cylindrical coil produces a uniform axial magnetic field and gas is introduced and ionized, creating a background plasma. Neutral particles are then injected into the plasma. They ionize and the heavier, positively-charged particles form a current ring which reverses the magnetic field.

Spheromaks are FRC-like configurations with finite toroidal magnetic field. FRCs have been formed through the merging of spheromaks of opposite and canceling toroidal field.

Rotating magnetic fields have also been used to drive current. In such experiments, as above, gas is ionized and an axial magnetic field is produced. A rotating magnetic field is produced by external magnetic coils perpendicular to the axis of the machine, and the direction of this field is rotated about the axis. When the rotation frequency is between the ion and electron gyro-frequencies, the electrons in the plasma co-rotate with the magnetic field (are "dragged"), producing current and reversing the magnetic field. More recently, so-called odd parity rotating magnetic fields have been used to preserve the closed topology of the FRC. It was analytically shown that at a very high critical threshold magnitude of 'odd parity' rotating magnetic field, the axisymmetric equilibrium magnetic field lines loses closure and fundamentally changes field topology.

== Single particle orbits ==
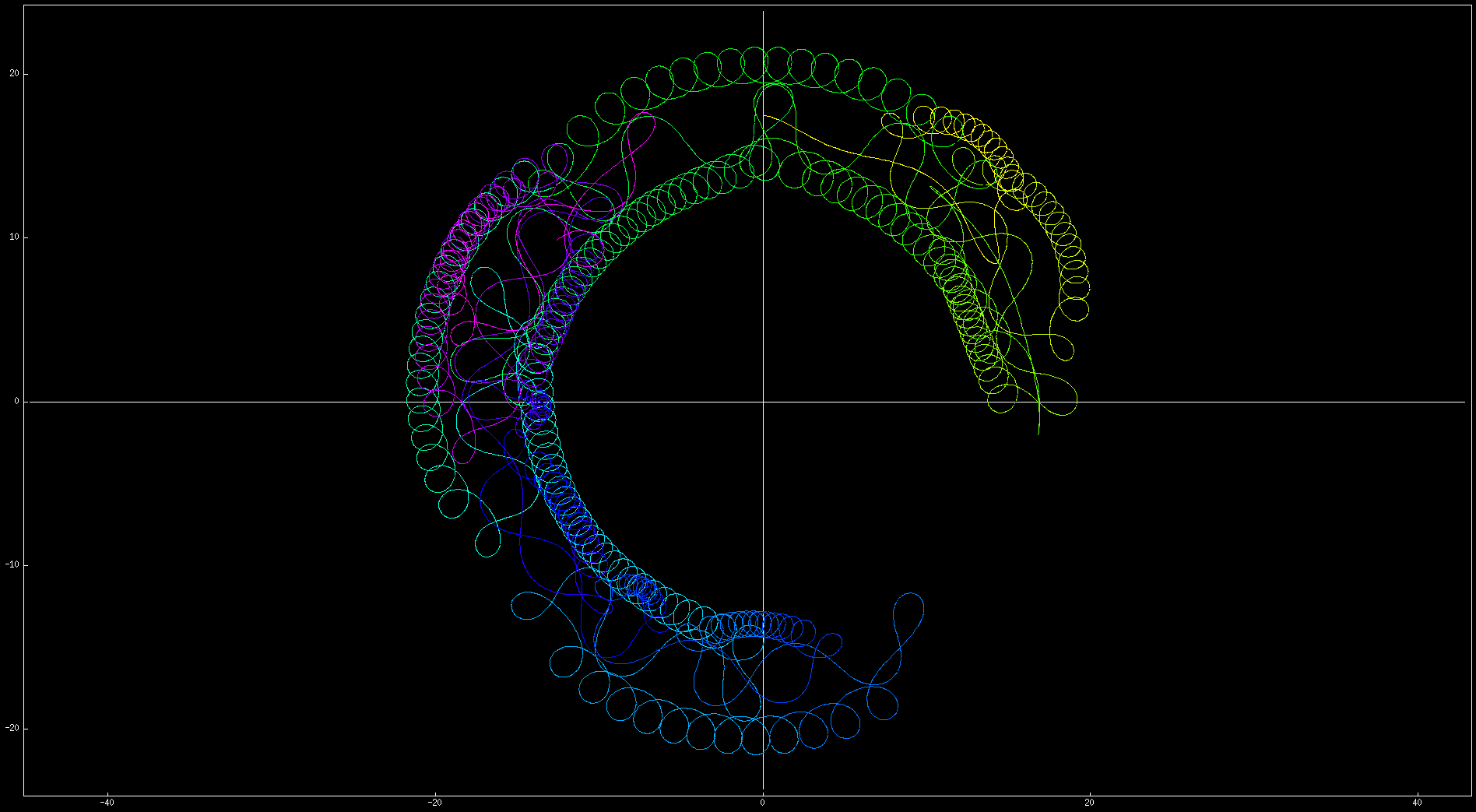
FRC particle trajectory in which a particle starts with cyclotron motion inside the null, transitions to betatron motion, and ends as cyclotron motion outside the null. This motion is in the midplane of the machine. Coils are above and below the figure.

FRCs contain an important and uncommon feature: a "magnetic null," or circular line on which the magnetic field is zero. This is necessarily the case, as inside the null the magnetic field points one direction and outside the null the magnetic field points the opposite direction. Particles far from the null trace closed cyclotron orbits as in other magnetic fusion geometries. Particles which cross the null, however, trace not cyclotron or circular orbits but betatron or figure-eight-like orbits, as the orbit's curvature changes direction when it crosses the magnetic null.

Because the particle's orbits are not cyclotron, models of plasma behavior based on cyclotron motion like magnetohydrodynamics (MHD) are inapplicable in the region around the null. The size of this region is related to the s-parameter, or the ratio of the distance between the null and separatrix, and the thermal ion gyroradius. At high-s, most particles do not cross the null and this effect is negligible. At low-s, ~2, this effect dominates and the FRC is said to be "kinetic" rather than "MHD."

== Plasma stability ==
At low s-parameter, most ions inside an FRC follow large betatron orbits (their average gyroradius is about half the size of the plasma) which are typical in accelerator physics rather than plasma physics. These FRCs are very stable because the plasma is not dominated by usual small gyroradius particles like other thermodynamic equilibrium or nonthermal plasmas. Its behavior is not described by classical magnetohydrodynamics, hence there are no Alfvén waves and almost no MHD instabilities despite their theoretical prediction, and it avoids the typical "anomalous transport", i.e. processes in which excess loss of particles or energy occurs.

As of 2000, several remaining instabilities are being studied:

- The tilt and shift modes. Those instabilities can be mitigated by either including a passive stabilizing conductor, or by forming very oblate plasmas (i.e. very elongated plasmas), or by creating a self-generated toroidal field. The tilt mode has also been stabilized in FRC experiments by increasing the ion gyroradii.
- The magnetorotational instability. This mode causes a rotating elliptical distortion of the plasma boundary, and can destroy the FRC when the distorted plasma comes in contact with the confinement chamber. Successful stabilization methods include the use of a quadrupole stabilizing field, and the effects of a rotating magnetic field (RMF).

== Experiments ==
Selected field reverse experiments, pre-1988
Year	Device	Location	Device length (meter)	Device diameter (meter)	B-field (tesla)	Fill pressure (pascal)	Confinement (seconds)	Studied
1959	-	NRL	0.10	0.06	10.00	13.33	2.E-06	Annihilation
1961	Scylla I	LANL	0.11	0.05	5.50	11.33	3.E-06	Annihilation
1962	Scylla III	LANL	0.19	0.08	12.50	11.33	4.E-06	Rotation
1962	Thetatron	Culham	0.21	0.05	8.60	13.33	3.E-06	Contraction
1962		Julich	0.10	0.04	6.00	30.66	1.E-06	Formation, tearing
1963		Culham	0.30	0.10	5.00	6.67	6.E-06	Contraction
1964	0-PII	Garching	0.30	0.05	5.30	13.33	1.E-06	Tearing, contraction
1965	Pharos	NRL	1.80	0.17	3.00	8.00	3.E-05	Confinement, rotation
1967	Centaur	Culham	0.50	0.19	2.10	2.67	2.E-05	Confinement, rotation
1967	Julietta	Julich	1.28	0.11	2.70	6.67	2.E-05	Tearing
1971	E-G	Garching	0.70	0.11	2.80	6.67	3.E-05	Tearing, rotation
1975	BN	Kurchatov	0.90	0.21	0.45	0.27 - 1.07	5.E-05	Formation
1979	TOR	Kurchatov	1.50	0.30	1.00	0.27 - 0.67	1.E-04	Formation
1979	FRX-A	LASL	1.00	0.25	0.60	0.53 - 0.93	3.E-05	Confinement
1981	FRX-B	LANL	1.00	0.25	1.30	1.20 - 6.53	6.E-05	Confinement
1982	STP-L	Nagoya	1.50	0.12	1.00	1.20	3.E-05	Rotation
1982	NUCTE	Nihon	2.00	0.16	1.00		6.E-05	Confinement, rotation
1982	PIACE	Osaka	1.00	0.15	1.40		6.E-05	Rotation
1983	FRX-C	LANL	2.00	0.50	0.80	0.67 - 2.67	3.E-04	Confinement
1984	TRX-1	MSNW	1.00	0.25	1.00	0.67 -2.00	2.E-04	Formation, confinement
1984	CTTX	Penn S U	0.50	0.12	0.40	13.33	4.E-05	Confinement
1985	HBQM	U Wash	3.00	0.22	0.50	0.53 - 0.93	3.E-05	Formation
1986	OCT	Osaka	0.60	0.22	1.00		1.E-04	Confinement
1986	TRX-2	STI	1.00	0.24	1.30	0.40 - 2.67	1.E-04	Formation, confinement
1987	CSS	U Wash	1.00	0.45	0.30	1.33 - 8.00	6.E-05	Slow formation
1988	FRXC/LSM	LANL	2.00	0.70	0.60	0.27 - 1.33	5.E-04	Formation, confinement
1990	LSX	STI/MSNW	5.00	0.90	0.80	0.27 - 0.67		Stability, confinement

Selected field reverse configurations, 1988 - 2011
Device	Institution	Device type	Electron density	Max ion or electron	FRC diameter	Length/diameter
			10^{20} / Meter^{3}	Temperature [eV]	[Meter]	
Spheromak-3	Tokyo University	Merging spheromak	5.0 – 10.0	20 – 100	0.40	1.0
Spheromak-4	Tokyo University	Merging spheromak		10 – 40	1.20 - 1.40	0.5 – 0.7
Compact Torus Exp-III	Nihon University	Theta-pinch	5.0 – 400.0	200 – 300	0.10 - 0.40	5.0 – 10.0
Field-Reversed Exp Liner	Los Alamos	Theta-pinch	1,500.0 – 2,500.0	200 – 700	0.03 - 0.05	7.0 – 10.0
FRC Injection Exp	Osaka University	Translation trapping	3.0 – 5.0	200 – 300	0.30 - 0.40	7.0 – 15.0
Swarthmore Spheromak Exp	Swarthmore	Merging spheromak	100	20 – 40	0.40	1.5
Magnetic Reconnection Exp	Princeton (PPPL)	Merging spheromak	5.0 – 20.0	30	1.00	0.3 – 0.7
Princeton field-reversed configuration experiment (PFRC)	Princeton (PPPL)	Rotating B-field	0.05 – 0.3	200 – 300	0.06	
Translation Confinement Sustainment	University of Washington	Rotating B-field	0.1 – 2.5	25 – 50	0.70 - 0.74	
Translation Confinement Sustainment-Upgrade	University of Washington	Rotating B-field	0.4 – 1.5	50 – 200	0.70 - 0.74	1.5 – 3.0
Plasma Liner Compression	MSNW	Translation trapping			0.20	
Inductive Plasma Accelerator	MSNW	Merging collision	23.0 – 26.0	350	0.20	
Inductive Plasma Accelerator-C	MSNW	Merging compression	300.0	1200 - 2000	0.2	10.0
Colorado FRC	University of Colorado	Merging spheromak				
Irvine Field Reverse Configuration	UC Irvine	Coaxial source	150.0	10	0.60	
C-2	Tri Alpha Energy, Inc.	Merging collision	5.0 – 10.0	200 – 500	0.60 - 0.80	3.0 – 5.0
STX	University of Washington	Rotating B-field	0.5	40	0.4	6
Prairie View Rotamak	Prairie View A&M	Rotating B-field	0.1	10-30	0.4	2

== Spacecraft propulsion ==
Field-reversed configuration devices have been considered for spacecraft propulsion. By angling the walls of the device outward, the plasmoid can be accelerated in the axial direction and out of the device, generating thrust.

NASA research has investigated FRC acceleration specifically for space propulsion. The FRC Acceleration Space Thruster (FAST) experiment was designed to repeatedly produce FRCs and accelerate them to high velocity for use in a nuclear-electric-propulsion system.
