= Plasmoid =

Plasma and magnetic field structure

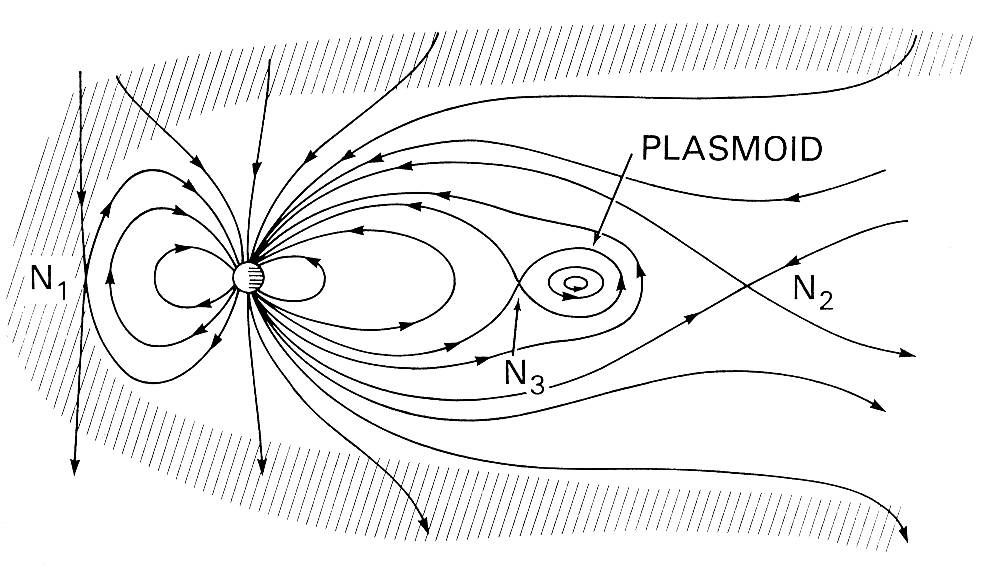
Natural plasmoid produced in the near-Earth magnetotail by magnetic reconnection

A plasmoid is a coherent structure of plasma and magnetic fields. Plasmoids have been proposed to explain natural phenomena such as ball lightning, magnetic bubbles in the magnetosphere, and objects in cometary tails, in the solar wind, solar atmosphere, and in the heliospheric current sheet. Plasmoids produced in the laboratory include the compact toroids (similar to a vortex ring in low temperature fluid dynamics or hydrodynamics) field-reversed configurations, spheromaks, and filamentary variants in dense plasma focuses.

The word plasmoid was coined in 1956 by Winston H. Bostick (1916–1991) to mean a "plasma-magnetic entity":

The plasma is emitted not as an amorphous blob, but in the form of a torus. We shall take the liberty of calling this toroidal structure a plasmoid, a word which means plasma-magnetic entity. The word plasmoid will be employed as a generic term for all plasma-magnetic entities.

— Winston H. Bostick

== Characteristics ==
Bostick researched the basic traits, and many details, of plasmoids.

Plasmoids appear to be plasma cylinders elongated in the direction of the magnetic field. Plasmoids possess a measurable magnetic moment, a measurable translational speed, a transverse electric field, and a measurable size. Plasmoids can interact with each other, seemingly by reflecting off one another. Their orbits can also be made to curve toward one another. Plasmoids can be made to spiral to a stop if projected into a gas at about 10^{−3} mm Hg pressure. Plasmoids can also be made to smash each other into fragments. There is some scant evidence to support the hypothesis that they undergo fission and possess spin.

— Winston H. Bostick

A plasmoid has an internal pressure stemming from both the gas pressure of the plasma and the magnetic pressure of the field. To maintain an approximately static plasmoid radius, this pressure must be balanced by an external confining pressure. In a field-free vacuum, a plasmoid expands and dissipates rapidly.

Plasmoids have been formed in discharges with local magnetic field strengths on the order of 16,000 tesla.

== Astronomic applications ==
Bostick went on to apply his theory of plasmoids to astrophysics phenomena. His 1958 paper, applied plasma similarity transformations to pairs of plasmoids fired from a plasma gun (dense plasma focus device) that interact in such a way as to simulate an early model of galaxy formation.
