= H. Stanley Allen =

English physicist (1873–1954)

Herbert Stanley Allen FRSE FRS
- Allen in 1931.
- Born: 29 December 1873; Bodmin, Cornwall, England
- Died: 27 April 1954 (aged 80); Balblair, Ross-shire, Scotland
- Citizenship: United Kingdom
- Education: Trinity College, Cambridge; King's College; University of London
- Known for: X-rays; Photo-electricity; Quantum mechanics
- Awards: Fellow of the Royal Society, 1930; Makdougall Brisbane prize, 1924
- Scientific career
- Fields: Physicist
- Workplaces: King's College London; University of London; University of Edinburgh; University of St Andrews
- Doctoral advisor: J. J. Thomson; Harold A. Wilson; Charles Glover Barkla

Herbert Stanley Allen FRSE FRS (29 December 1873 – 27 April 1954) was an English physicist from Cornwall noted as a pioneer in early X-ray research, working under J. J. Thomson at the University of London and alongside Nobel laureate Charles Glover Barkla at the University of Edinburgh. A supporter of the Parson magneton, Allen was also an early contributor to the field of quantum mechanics.

== Biography ==
Allen was born in Bodmin in Cornwall, the son of Rev Richard Allen, a Wesleyan Methodist Minister. He attended John Wesley's School in Bath, Somerset.

As an undergraduate at Trinity College, Cambridge, Allen shared Whewell's Court with fellow pupil Edmund Whittaker, earning his Mathematics B.A. there in 1896. After working at Cavendish Laboratory, Allen returned to Cambridge in 1898 to conduct research under J. J. Thomson on the motion of spheres through viscous fluids, useful in the determination of the elementary unit of charge. In 1900, he moved to Renfrew, where he researched spectral photography, the Zeeman effect, and radioactivity under Lord Blythwood. He was appointed lecturer in 1905 at King's College London where he obtained a D.Sc. in 1909 for his work on the discharge of electricity through gases. He conducted this work under Harold A. Wilson and contemporary Charles Glover Barkla, whom he followed to the University of Edinburgh in 1919.

Allen's 1913 book, "Photo-electricity", was an early contribution to the study of radiation, focusing on his earlier work in photoelectric fatigue. He then wrote a series of papers concerned with structure of the atom based on its magnetic and spectral properties. Beginning in 1919, he contributed a series of articles favoring a modified version of the Parson magneton, a physical model for the electron originally proposed in 1915 Quantum theory was then in its infancy and Allen's contributions were among the earliest to the subject.

Fellow academic Sir D’Arcy Thompson said of him, "Perhaps he does not realize how strongly he has endeared himself to his colleagues and his students by his own personality, his faith and vision…" Allen died 27 April 1954 at the home of his daughter in Balblair, Ross-shire, Scotland.
