= Compact toroid =

A compact toroid (CT) is a type of plasmoid, a class of toroidal plasma configuration that is self-stable, and which does not need magnet coils running through the center of the toroid. They are studied mainly in the field of fusion power, where a lack of complex magnets and a simple geometry may allow building dramatically simpler and less costly fusion reactors.

The two best studied compact toroids are the spheromak and field-reversed configuration (FRC). A third configuration, the particle ring, lacks attractive performance to date.

A CT containment system for plasma asymmetrically toroidally shaped by the containment, was first introduced into thought as a concept by Alfvén. The two examplar types; Field-reversed configuration plasma with a null toroid, firstly, is generally produced by prolate-theta-pinches with the necessarily existing field condition where the field magnetic bias is in a reversed situation. The second type has a non-null toroid, known as a spheromak configuration, is similar in arrangement to a vortex ring such as a smoke ring. The FRC is also toroidal, but extended into a tubular shape or hollow cylinder. The main difference between the two is that the spheromak contains poloidal (vertical rings) and toroidal (horizontal) magnetic fields, while the FRC has only the poloidal fields and requires an external magnet for confinement. In both cases the combination of electrical currents and their associated magnetic fields result in a series of closed magnetic lines that maintains the ring shape, without need of magnets in the plasma center, unlike a tokamak.

Of the two, the FRC naturally has a higher beta, a measure of fusion economics. However, the spheromak had generated better confinement times and temperatures, and recent work suggests that great advances in performance can be made.

Compact toroids are also similar to the spherical tokamak, and many spherical tokamak machines were converted from earlier spheromak reactors.

== See also ==
- High beta fusion reactor
