= Alfred Lauck Parson =

British chemist and physicist

- Born: 24 October 1889; Lucknow, India
- Died: 1 January 1970 (aged 80); Allonby, England
- Education: Oxford University; Harvard University; University of California, Berkeley
- Known for: Parson magneton
- Scientific career
- Fields: Chemist; Physicist

Alfred Lauck Parson (24 October 1889 – 1 January 1970) was a British chemist and physicist, whose "magneton theory" of the atom contributed to the history of chemistry.

== Biography ==
Born in Lucknow, India to Rev. Joseph and Sarah Jane (Lauck) Parson, Alfred received his BS in chemistry from Oxford University. Between 1913 and 1915 he was a visiting graduate student at Harvard and the University of California, Berkeley, where coincidentally Gilbert N. Lewis was working as the chair of the department of chemistry. During these years, Lewis read a paper by Parson, which argued that the electron, in the Bohr model, might be a ring of negative electricity spinning with a high velocity about its axis and that a chemical bond results from two electrons being shared between two atoms. Parson published the final draft of his theory in 1915. Stimulated by this paper, Lewis published his famous 1916 article "The Atom and the Molecule", in which a chemical bond forms owing to the sharing of pairs of electrons. Several other physicists of the time, including Arthur H. Compton, Clinton Davisson, Lars O. Grondahl, David L. Webster, and H. Stanley Allen, developed Parson's ideas further using a toroidal ring model for the atom.

Parson himself returned to England, where he served in World War I. Suffering from severe shell shock, he did not pursue an academic career, but years later published papers and books on astronomy and related topics. He died 1970 in Allonby, England.

== Scientific contributions ==
The Parson magneton, also known as the "magnetic electron," was a hypothetical object in atomic physics suggested by Parson in 1915: an electron ring that generates a magnetic field. Parson's model of the atom inspired several other toroidal ring models.

== See also ==
- History of the molecule
- History of quantum mechanics
