= John Bryan Taylor =

British physicist (1928–2026)

- John Bryan Taylor in 1965
- Born: 26 December 1928; Birmingham, England
- Died: 14 May 2026 (aged 97); Wiltshire, England
- Awards: James Clerk Maxwell Medal and Prize (1971); Max Born Medal and Prize (1979); James Clerk Maxwell Prize for Plasma Physics (1999); Hannes Alfvén Prize (2004)
- Scientific career
- Fields: Plasma physics

John Bryan Taylor (26 December 1928 – 14 May 2026) was a British physicist known for his contributions to plasma physics and their application in the field of fusion energy. Notable among these is the development of the "Taylor state", describing a minimum-energy configuration that conserves magnetic helicity. Another development was his work on the ballooning transformation, which describes the motion of plasma in toroidal (donut) configurations, which are used in the fusion field. Taylor has also made contributions to the theory of the Earth's Dynamo, including the Taylor constraint.

== Life and career ==
Taylor was born in Aston, Birmingham on 26 December 1928. He studied Physics as an Undergraduate at Birmingham under Rudolph Peierls, finishing first in his year. Rather than proceed immediately to postgraduate study he chose to serve in the Royal Air Force from 1950 to 1952, and then took his PhD at Birmingham University in 1955. Upon graduation, he joined the Atomic Weapons Establishment at Aldermaston, and in 1962 moved to the Culham Laboratory, where he became Chief Physicist. He held several other positions during this period, including the Commonwealth Fund Fellow at the University of California, Berkeley in 1959 to 1960, the Institute for Advanced Study in 1969, 1973 and 1980–81, and finally took the position of Fondren Professor of Plasma Theory at the University of Texas at Austin in 1989. Taylor was still actively involved in fusion science, working with Culham laboratory and Oxford University. He was elected a Fellow of the Royal Society in 1970.

Taylor died on 14 May 2026, at the age of 97.

== Honours and awards ==
Taylor won the Institute of Physics's James Clerk Maxwell Medal and Prize in 1971, and the Max Born Medal and Prize in 1979. He then went on to win the American Physical Society's James Clerk Maxwell Prize for Plasma Physics in 1999.

He initiated the study of chaos in magnetic surfaces, developing several contributions to chaos theory and introducing the "standard map" (or Chirikov–Taylor map). He studied 2D-plasmas, demonstrating the inherent Bohm diffusion which had been noticed in magnetic bottles since the 1950s. He then played a major part in developing the "ballooning transformation" for toroidal plasmas, along with Jack Connor and Jim Hastie, which won him the 2004 Hannes Alfvén Prize.
