= Toroidal ring model =

Model of subatomic particles

The toroidal ring model, known originally as the Parson magneton or magnetic electron, is a physical model of subatomic particles. It is also known as the plasmoid ring, vortex ring, or helicon ring. This physical model treated electrons and protons as elementary particles, and was first proposed by Alfred Lauck Parson in 1915.

== Theory ==
Instead of a single orbiting charge, the toroidal ring was conceived as a collection of infinitesimal charge elements, which orbited or circulated along a common continuous path or "loop". In general, this path of charge could assume any shape, but tended toward a circular form due to internal repulsive electromagnetic forces. In this configuration the charge elements circulated, but the ring as a whole did not radiate due to changes in electric or magnetic fields since it remained stationary. The ring produced an overall magnetic field ("spin") due to the current of the moving charge elements. These elements circulated around the ring at the speed of light c, but at frequency ν = c/2πR, which depended inversely on the radius R. The ring's inertial energy increased when compressed, like a spring, and was also inversely proportional to its radius, and therefore proportional to its frequency ν. The theory claimed that the proportionality constant was the Planck constant h, the conserved angular momentum of the ring.

According to the model, electrons or protons could be viewed as bundles of "fibers" or "plasmoids" with total charge ±e. The electrostatic repulsion force between charge elements of the same sign was balanced by the magnetic attraction force between the parallel currents in the fibers of a bundle, per Ampère's law. These fibers twisted around the torus of the ring as they progressed around its radius, forming a Slinky-like helix. Circuit completion demanded that each helical plasmoid fiber twisted around the ring an integer number of times as it proceeded around the ring. This requirement was thought to account for "quantum" values of angular momentum and radiation. Chirality demanded the number of fibers to be odd, probably three, like a rope. The helicity of the twist, was thought to distinguish the electron from the proton.

The toroidal or "helicon" model did not demand a constant radius or inertial energy for a particle. In general its shape, size, and motion adjusted according to the external electromagnetic fields from its environment. These adjustments or reactions to external field changes constituted the emission or absorption of radiation for the particle. The model, then, claimed to explain how particles linked together to form atoms.

== History ==
=== Beginnings ===
The development of the helicon or toroidal ring began with André-Marie Ampère, who in 1823 proposed tiny magnetic "loops of charge" to explain the attractive force between current elements. In that same era Carl Friedrich Gauss and Michael Faraday also uncovered foundational laws of classical electrodynamics, later collected by James Maxwell as Maxwell's equations. When Maxwell expressed the laws of Gauss, Faraday, and Ampère in differential form, he assumed point particles, an assumption that remains foundational to relativity theory and quantum mechanics today. In 1867 Lord Kelvin suggested that the vortex rings of a perfect fluid discovered by Hermann von Helmholtz represented "the only true atoms". Then shortly before 1900, as scientists still debated over the very existence of atoms, J. J. Thomson and Ernest Rutherford sparked a revolution with experiments confirming the existence and properties of electrons, protons, and nuclei. Max Planck added to the fire when he solved the blackbody radiation problem by assuming not only discrete particles, but discrete frequencies of radiation emanating from these "particles" or "resonators". Planck's famous paper, which incidentally calculated both the Planck constant h and the Boltzmann constant k_{B}, suggested that something in the "resonators" themselves provided these discrete frequencies.

Numerous theories about the structure of the atom developed in the wake of all the new information, of which the 1913 model of Niels Bohr came to predominate. The Bohr model proposed electrons in circular orbit around the nucleus with quantized values of angular momentum. Instead of radiating energy continuously, as classical electrodynamics demanded from an accelerating charge, Bohr's electron radiated discretely when it "leaped" from one state of angular momentum to another.

=== Parson magneton ===
In 1915, Alfred Lauck Parson proposed his "magneton" as an improvement over the Bohr model, depicting finite-sized particles with the ability to maintain stability and emit and absorb radiation from electromagnetic waves. At about the same time Leigh Page developed a classical theory of blackbody radiation assuming rotating "oscillators", able to store energy without radiating. Gilbert N. Lewis was inspired in part by Parson's model in developing his theory of chemical bonding. Then David L. Webster wrote three papers connecting Parson's magneton with Page's oscillator and explaining mass and alpha scattering in terms of the magneton. In 1917 Lars O. Grondahl confirmed the model with his experiments on free electrons in iron wires. Parson's theory next attracted the attention of Arthur Compton, who wrote a series of papers on the properties of the electron, and H. Stanley Allen, whose papers also argued for a "ring electron".

== Current status ==
The aspect of the Parson magneton with the most experimental relevance (and the aspect investigated by Grondahl and Webster) was the existence of an electron magnetic dipole moment; this dipole moment is indeed present. However, later work by Paul Dirac and Alfred Landé showed that a pointlike particle could have an intrinsic quantum spin, and also a magnetic moment. The highly successful modern theory, Standard Model of particle physics describes a pointlike electron with an intrinsic spin and magnetic moment. On the other hand, the usual assertion that an electron is pointlike may be conventionally associated only with a "bare" electron. The pointlike electron would have a diverging electromagnetic field, which should create a strong vacuum polarization. In accordance with QED, deviations from the Coulomb law are predicted at Compton scale distances from the centre of electron, 10^{−11} cm. Virtual processes in the Compton region determine the spin of electron and renormalization of its charge and mass. It shows that the Compton region of the electron should be considered as a coherent whole with its pointlike core, forming a physical ("dressed") electron. Notice that the Dirac theory of electron also exhibits the peculiar behaviour of the Compton region. In particular, electrons display zitterbewegung at the Compton scale. From this point of view, the ring model does not contradict QED or the Dirac theory and some versions could possibly be used to incorporate gravity in quantum theory.

The question of whether the electron has a substructure of any sort must be decided by experiment. All experiments to date agree with the Standard Model of the electron, with no substructure, ring-like or otherwise. The two major approaches are high-energy electron–positron scattering and high-precision atomic tests of quantum electrodynamics, both of which agree that the electron is point-like at resolutions down to 10^{−20} m. At present, the Compton region of virtual processes, 10^{−11} cm across, is not exhibited in the high-energy experiments on electron–positron scattering.

Nikodem Popławski use the Papapetrou method of multipole expansion to show that torsion modifies Burinskii’s model of the Dirac electron by replacing the Kerr–Newman singular ring of the Compton size with a toroidal structure with the outer radius of the Compton size and the inner radius of the Cartan size (10^{−27} m) in the Einstein–Cartan theory of gravity.
