= Prairie View Rotamak =

The Prairie View (PV) Rotamak is a plasma physics experiment at Prairie View A&M University. The experiment studies magnetic plasma confinement to support controlled nuclear fusion experiments. Specifically, the PV Rotamak can be used as either a spherical tokamak or a field-reversed configuration. Some time between 2015 and 2017, most personnel moved on to advanced career opportunities. In 2017, a Final Report to Department of Energy (DOE) was prepared and submitted by Dr. Saganti of PVAMU on the entire research work supported by DOE for 12 years.

== Background ==
FRCs and spherical tokamaks are of interest to the plasma physics community because of their confinement properties and their small size. While most large fusion experiments in the world are tokamaks, FRCs and STs are seen as a viable alternative because of their higher Beta, meaning the same power output could be produced from a smaller volume of plasma, and their good plasma stability.

== History ==
The PV Rotamak was built in 2001, largely out of components of the disassembled Flinders Rotamak. The PV Rotamak has furnished the experimental data to produce more than 12 academic papers on plasma physics as of 2017. More recent pictorial depictions and short videos with all the equipment layout can be found from Saganti-PVSO Google Site.

== Apparatus ==
The experimental apparatus consists of a vacuum vessel, electromagnetic coils, a high-power radio-frequency (RF) generation system to run the rotating magnetic field (RMF), and diagnostics. The vacuum vessel is made of Pyrex glass and is 80 cm long and 40 cm in diameter. The electromagnetic coils can produce up to 230 Gauss (0.023 tesla) magnetic fields center of the vacuum vessel. Another electromagnetic coil running through the axis of the vacuum vessel can produce the magnetic field necessary to make the apparatus a spherical tokamak. The RF generation system can deliver 400 kW of power to the plasma in the form of a rotating magnetic field at a frequency of 500 kHz. The RMF can run for 40ms at a time.

== Plasma Parameters ==
The electron density during a typical discharge of the PV Rotamak is $1\cdot10^{12}/cm^3$. This is about 1000x lower than a burning thermonuclear plasma would have to achieve. The electron temperature during a typical discharge is 10-30eV, again about 1000x lower than a burning thermonuclear plasma. The power into the plasma is 400 kW, compared to 10s of MW in large Tokamaks.

== Contributions ==
Early experiments in the PV Rotamak sought to characterize the difference between FRC and Spherical tokamak configurations. They found that the inclusion of a toroidal magnetic field (turning the FRC into an ST) led to increased particle confinement and performance.

Later experiments sought to characterize and mitigate the n=1 tilt mode of the FRC. This is an instability of FRCs that can cause loss of the plasma. They measured the stability boundaries of this mode, and found that an additional electromagnetic coil around the middle of the machine pinched the FRC into two separate pieces, mitigating the tilt mode.

Recent (2015) experiments on the PV Rotamak dealt with heating the plasma with microwaves. 6 kW of power was injected into the plasma. Researchers found that they were able to drive current with the microwaves relatively efficiently, but this small amount of power was not sufficient to appreciably change the density or temperature of the plasma.
