= FEG =

FEG or Feg may refer to:

== Organisations ==
- Federación Española de Guidismo, the Spanish Federation of the Guide Movement
- Fegyver- és Gépgyár (FÉG), a Hungarian arms manufacturer
  - FÉG 37M Pistol
  - FEG AP9
  - FEG PA-63, semi-automatic pistol
- Fighting and Entertainment Group, a Japanese combat sport promoter
- Force Element Group, Australian Defence Force
- Foundation for Effective Governance, former Ukrainian organization
- Friedrich-Ebert-Gymnasium, a school in Hamburg, Germany
- Fox Entertainment Group, a former American entertainment company specialised in filmed entertainment

== Transportation ==
- Fellgate Metro station, South Tyneside, Tyne and Wear Metro station code
- Fergana International Airport, Uzbekistan, IATA code
- FlyEgypt, ICAO code for the Egyptian airline

== Other uses ==
- Phenylalanine-glutamine-glycine (FEG), an anti-inflammatory peptide, and feG, its D-isomeric form
- Field emission gun, a type of electron gun
- Ferroelectric generator
