= Carlqvist =

Carlqvist is a surname. Notable people with the surname include:

- Håkan Carlqvist, Swedish motocross racer
- Ingrid Carlqvist, Author, journalist, and far-right activist
- Margit Carlqvist (1932–2026), Swedish actress
- Per Carlqvist, Swedish physicist
