= Pinch (plasma physics) =

Compression of an electrically conducting filament by magnetic forces

Pinch phenomena

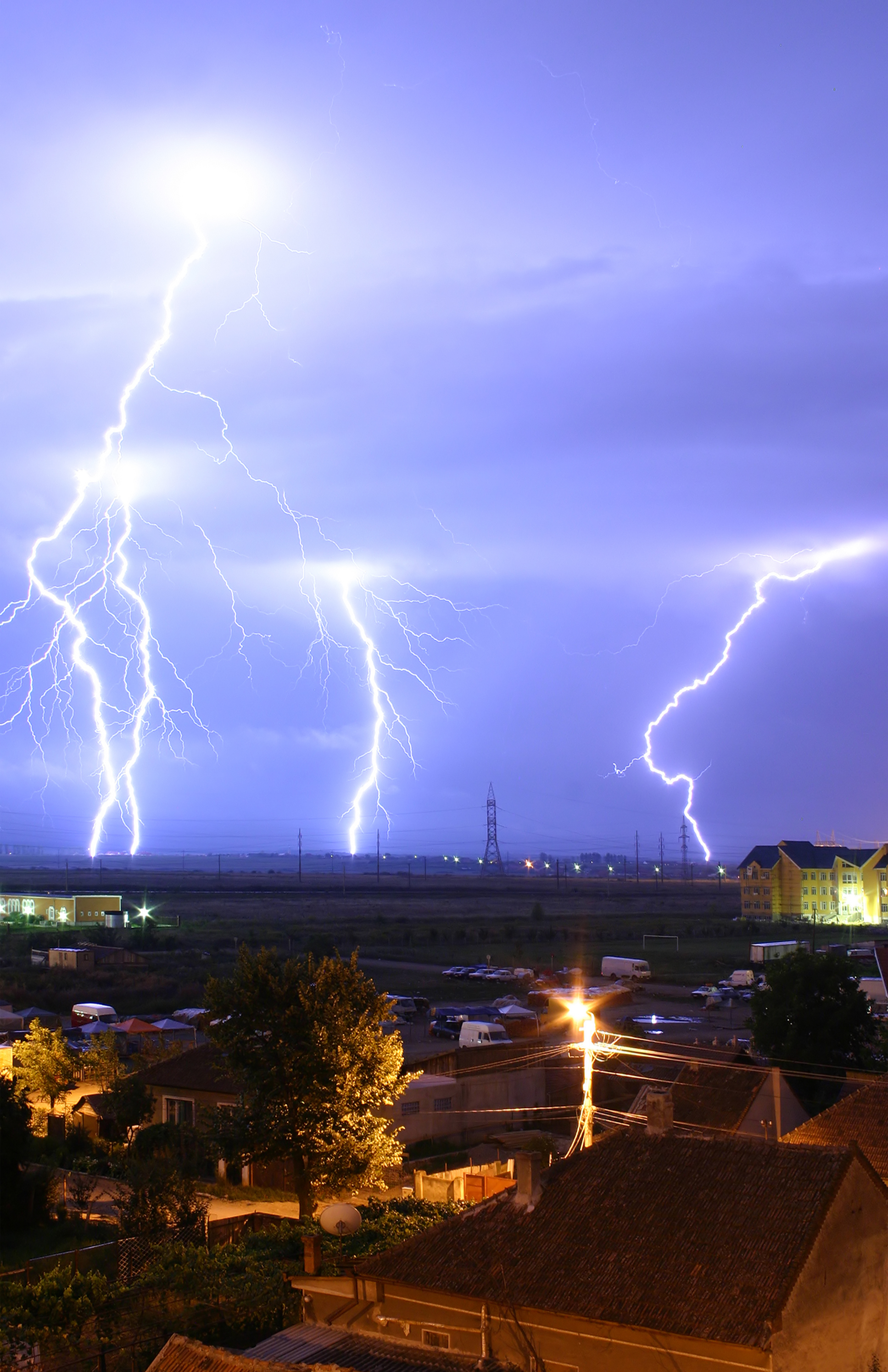
Lightning discharge bolts showing electromagnetically pinched plasma filaments

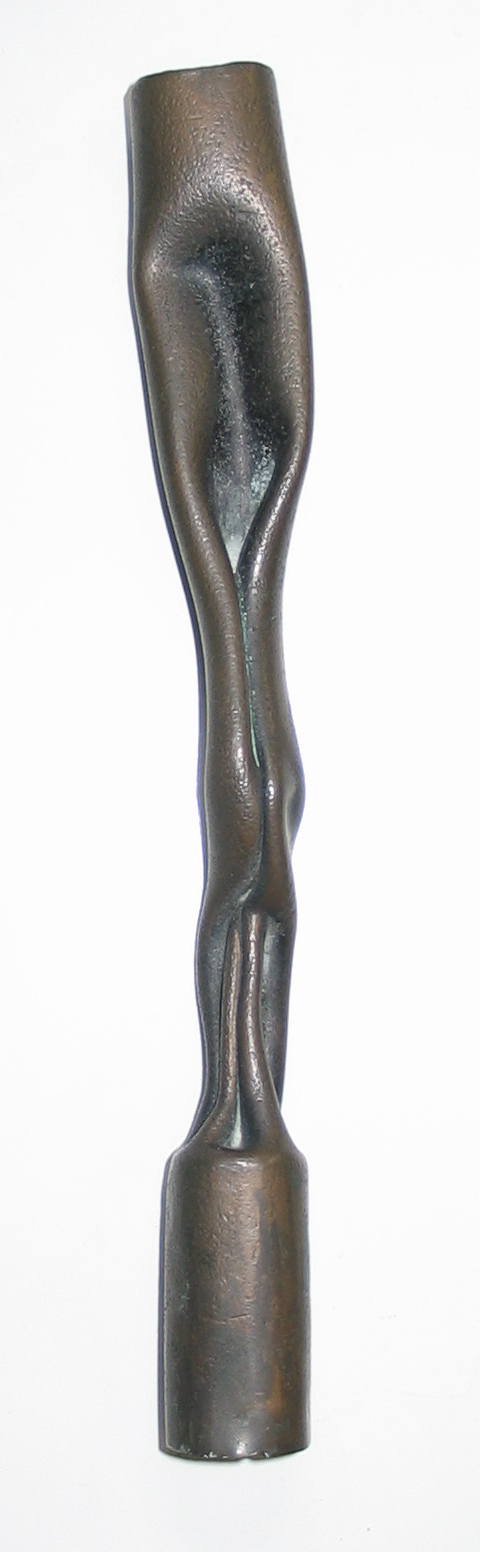
A 1905 study of pinches, where electric lightning was used to create a Z-pinch inside a metal tube.

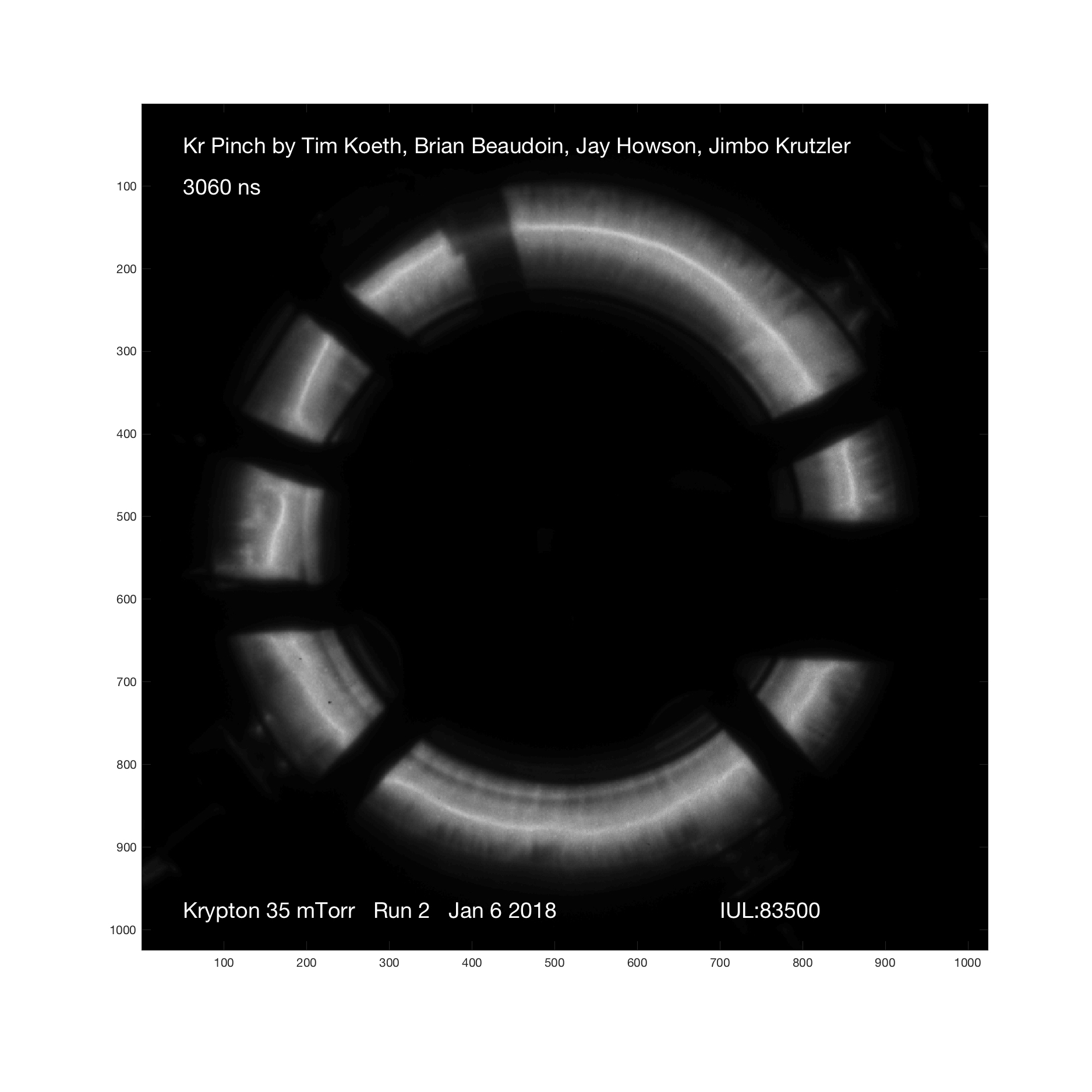
A current-driven toroidal Z-pinch in a krypton plasma

A pinch (or: Bennett pinch (after Willard Harrison Bennett), electromagnetic pinch, magnetic pinch, pinch effect, or plasma pinch.) is the compression of an electrically conducting filament by magnetic forces, or a device that does such. The conductor is usually a plasma, but could also be a solid or liquid metal. Pinches were the first type of device used for experiments in controlled nuclear fusion power.

Pinches occur naturally in electrical discharges such as lightning bolts, planetary auroras, current sheets, and solar flares.

== Basic mechanism ==
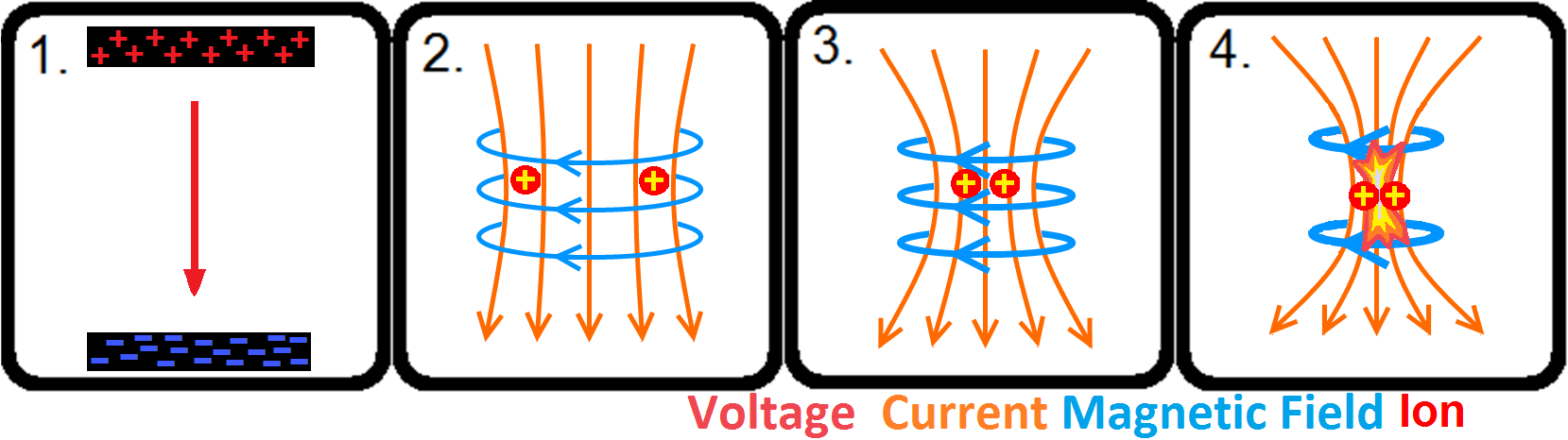
This is a basic explanation of how a pinch works. (1) Pinches apply a high voltage and current across a tube. This tube is filled with a gas, typically a fusion fuel such as deuterium. If the product of the voltage & the charge is higher than the ionization energy of the gas the gas ionizes. (2) Current jumps across this gap. (3) The current makes a magnetic field which is perpendicular to the current. This magnetic field pulls the material together due to the Lorentz force acting along the $\mathbf{j}\times\mathbf{B}$ direction. (4) These atoms can get close enough to fuse.

== Types ==
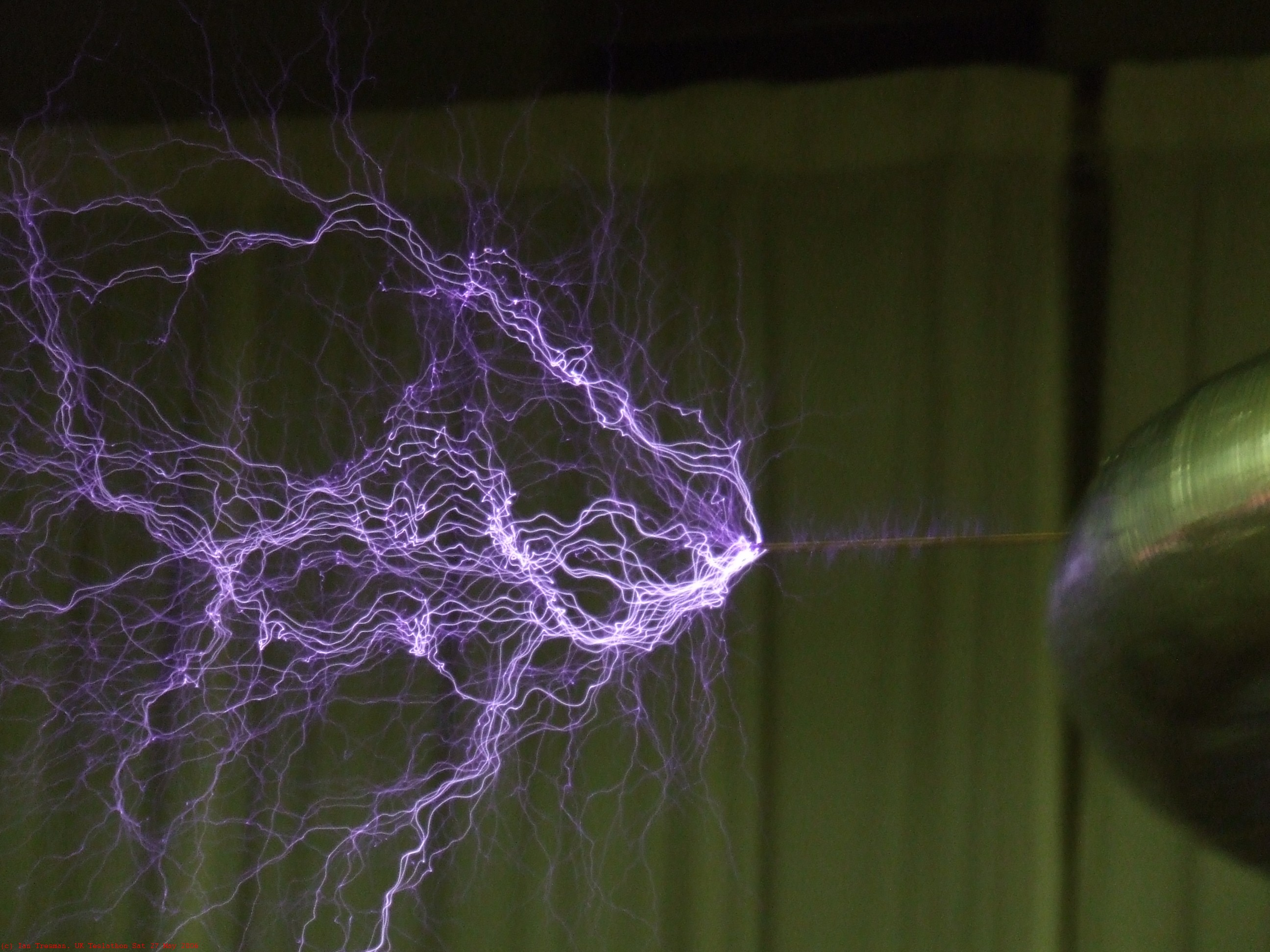
An example of a man-made pinch. Here Z-pinches constrain a plasma inside filaments of electrical discharge from a Tesla coil

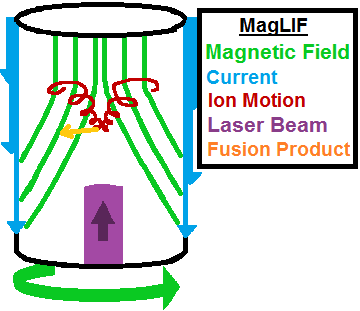
The MagLIF concept, a combination of a Z-pinch and a laser beam

Pinches exist in nature and in laboratories. Pinches differ in their geometry and operating forces. These include:

- Uncontrolled – Any time an electric current moves in large amounts (e.g., lightning, arcs, sparks, discharges) a magnetic force can pull together plasma. This can be insufficient for fusion.
- Sheet pinch – An astrophysical effect, this arises from vast sheets of charged particles.
- Z-pinch – The current runs down the axis, or walls, of a cylinder while the magnetic field is azimuthal
- Theta pinch – The magnetic field runs down the axis of a cylinder, while the electric field is in the azimuthal direction (also called a thetatron)
- Screw pinch – A combination of a Z-pinch and theta pinch (also called a stabilized Z-pinch, or θ-Z pinch)
- Reversed field pinch or toroidal pinch – This is a Z-pinch arranged in the shape of a torus. The plasma has an internal magnetic field. As distance increases from the center of this ring, the magnetic field reverses direction.
- Inverse pinch – An early fusion concept, this device consisted of a rod surrounded by plasma. Current traveled through the plasma and returned along the center rod. This geometry was slightly different than a z-pinch in that the conductor was in the center, not the sides.
- Cylindrical pinch
- Orthogonal pinch effect
- Ware pinch – A pinch that occurs inside a Tokamak plasma, when particles inside the banana orbit condense together.
- Magnetized liner inertial fusion (MagLIF) – A Z-pinch of preheated, premagnetized fuel inside a metal liner, which could lead to ignition and practical fusion energy with a larger pulsed-power driver.

== Common behavior ==
Pinches may become unstable. They radiate energy across the whole electromagnetic spectrum including radio waves, microwaves, infrared, x-rays, gamma rays, synchrotron radiation, and visible light. They also produce neutrons, as a product of fusion.

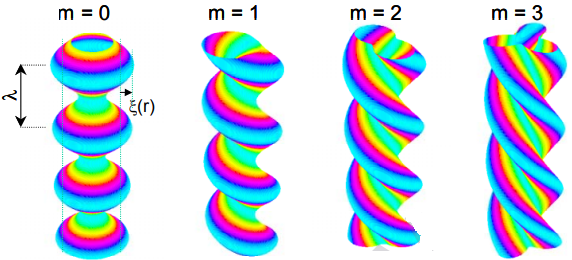
Model of the kink modes that form inside a pinch

== Applications and devices ==
Pinches are used to generate X-rays and the intense magnetic fields generated are used in electromagnetic forming of metals. They also have applications in particle beams including particle beam weapons, astrophysics studies and it has been proposed to use them in space propulsion. A number of large pinch machines have been built to study fusion power; here are several:

- MAGPIE A Z-pinch at Imperial College. This dumps a large amount of current across a wire. Under these conditions, the wire becomes plasma and compresses to produce fusion.
- Z Pulsed Power Facility at Sandia National Laboratories.
- ZETA device in Culham, England
- Madison Symmetric Torus at the University of Wisconsin, Madison
- Reversed-Field eXperiment in Italy.
- Dense plasma focus in New Jersey
- University of Nevada, Reno (USA)
- Cornell University (USA)
- University of Michigan (USA)
- University of California, San Diego (USA)
- University of Washington (USA)
- Ruhr University (Germany)
- École Polytechnique (France)
- Weizmann Institute of Science (Israel)
- Universidad Autónoma Metropolitana (Mexico).
- Zap Energy Inc. (USA)

=== Crushing cans with the pinch effect ===
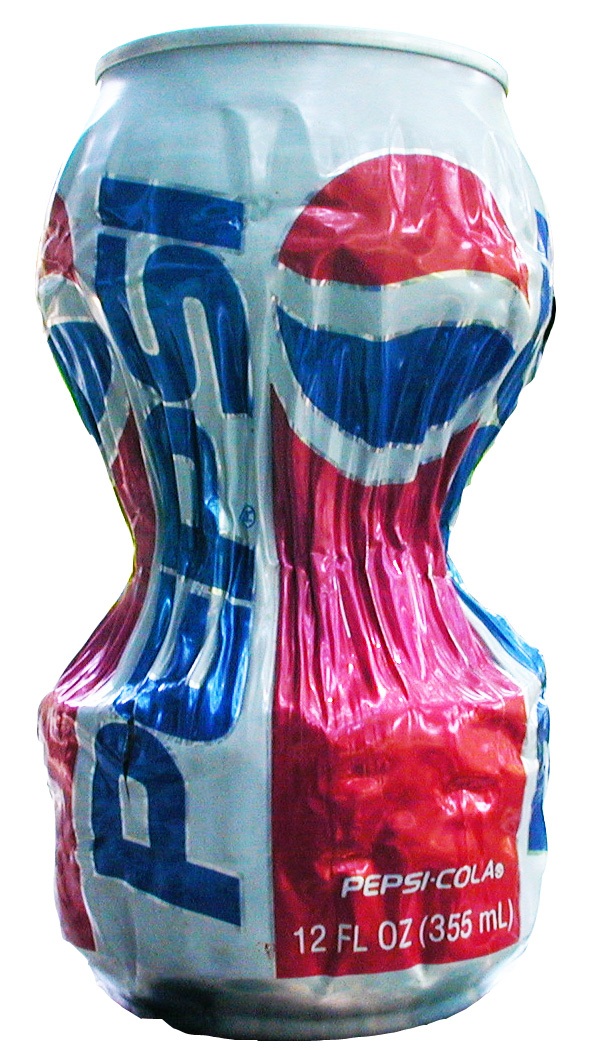
Pinched aluminium can, produced via a pulsed magnetic field created by rapidly discharging 2 kilojoules from a high voltage capacitor bank into a 3-turn coil of heavy gauge wire.

Many high-voltage electronics enthusiasts make their own crude electromagnetic forming devices. They use pulsed power techniques to produce a theta pinch able to crush an aluminium soft drink can using the Lorentz forces created when large currents are induced in the can by the strong magnetic field of the primary coil.

An electromagnetic aluminium can crusher consists of four main components: a high-voltage DC power supply, which provides a source of electrical energy, a large energy discharge capacitor to accumulate the electrical energy, a high voltage switch or spark gap, and a robust coil (capable of surviving high magnetic pressure) through which the stored electrical energy can be quickly discharged in order to generate a correspondingly strong pinching magnetic field (see diagram below).

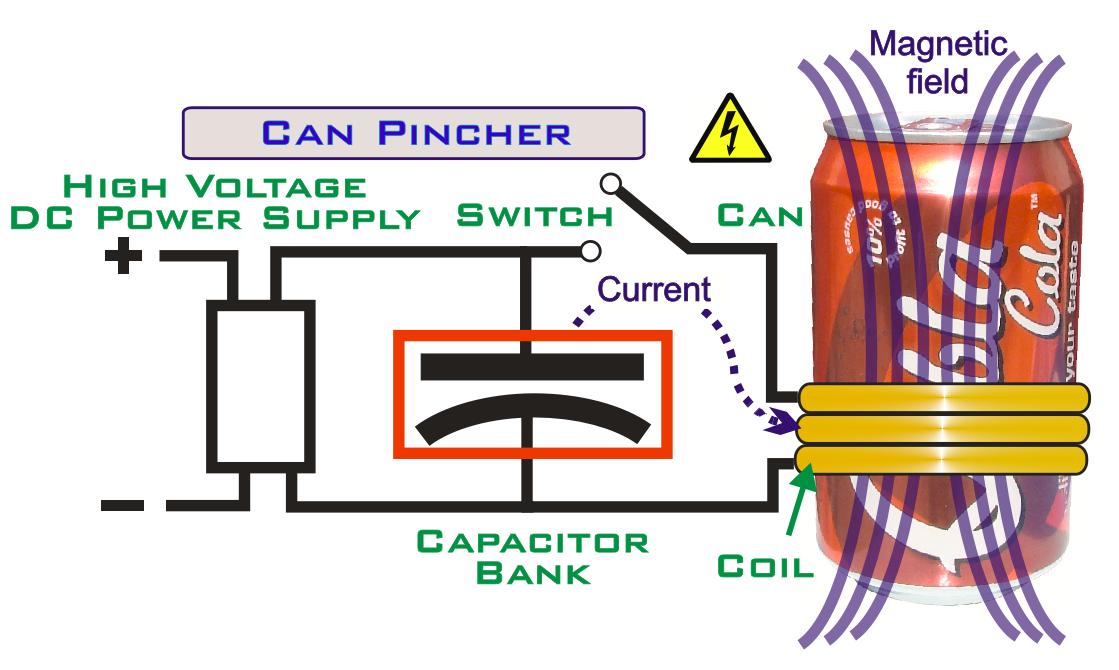
Electromagnetic pinch "can crusher": schematic diagram

In practice, such a device is somewhat more sophisticated than the schematic diagram suggests, including electrical components that control the current in order to maximize the resulting pinch, and to ensure that the device works safely. For more details, see the notes.

== History ==
The Institute of Electrical and Electronics Engineers emblem shows the basic features of an azimuthal magnetic pinch.

The first creation of a Z-pinch in the laboratory may have occurred in 1790 in Holland when Martinus van Marum created an explosion by discharging 100 Leyden jars into a wire. The phenomenon was not understood until 1905, when Pollock and Barraclough investigated a compressed and distorted length of copper tube from a lightning rod after it had been struck by lightning. Their analysis showed that the forces due to the interaction of the large current flow with its own magnetic field could have caused the compression and distortion. A similar, and apparently independent, theoretical analysis of the pinch effect in liquid metals was published by Northrup in 1907. The next major development was the publication in 1934 of an analysis of the radial pressure balance in a static Z-pinch by Bennett (see the following section for details).

Thereafter, the experimental and theoretical progress on pinches was driven by fusion power research. In their article on the "Wire-array Z-pinch: a powerful x-ray source for ICF", M G Haines et al., wrote on the "Early history of Z-pinches".

In 1946 Thompson and Blackman submitted a patent for a fusion reactor based on a toroidal Z-pinch with an additional vertical magnetic field. But in 1954 Kruskal and Schwarzschild published their theory of MHD instabilities in a Z-pinch. In 1956, Kurchatov gave his famous Harwell lecture showing nonthermal neutrons and the presence of m = 0 and m = 1 instabilities in a deuterium pinch. In 1957 Pease and Braginskii independently predicted radiative collapse in a Z-pinch under pressure balance when in hydrogen the current exceeds 1.4 MA. (The viscous rather than resistive dissipation of magnetic energy discussed above and in would however prevent radiative collapse).

In 1958, the world's first controlled thermonuclear fusion experiment was accomplished using a theta-pinch machine named Scylla I at the Los Alamos National Laboratory. A cylinder full of deuterium was converted into a plasma and compressed to 15 million degrees Celsius under a theta-pinch effect. Lastly, at Imperial College in 1960, led by R Latham, the Plateau–Rayleigh instability was shown, and its growth rate measured in a dynamic Z-pinch.

== Equilibrium analysis ==
=== One dimension ===
In plasma physics three pinch geometries are commonly studied: the θ-pinch, the Z-pinch, and the screw pinch. These are cylindrically shaped. The cylinder is symmetric in the axial (z) direction and the azimuthal (θ) directions. The one-dimensional pinches are named for the direction the current travels.

==== The θ-pinch ====
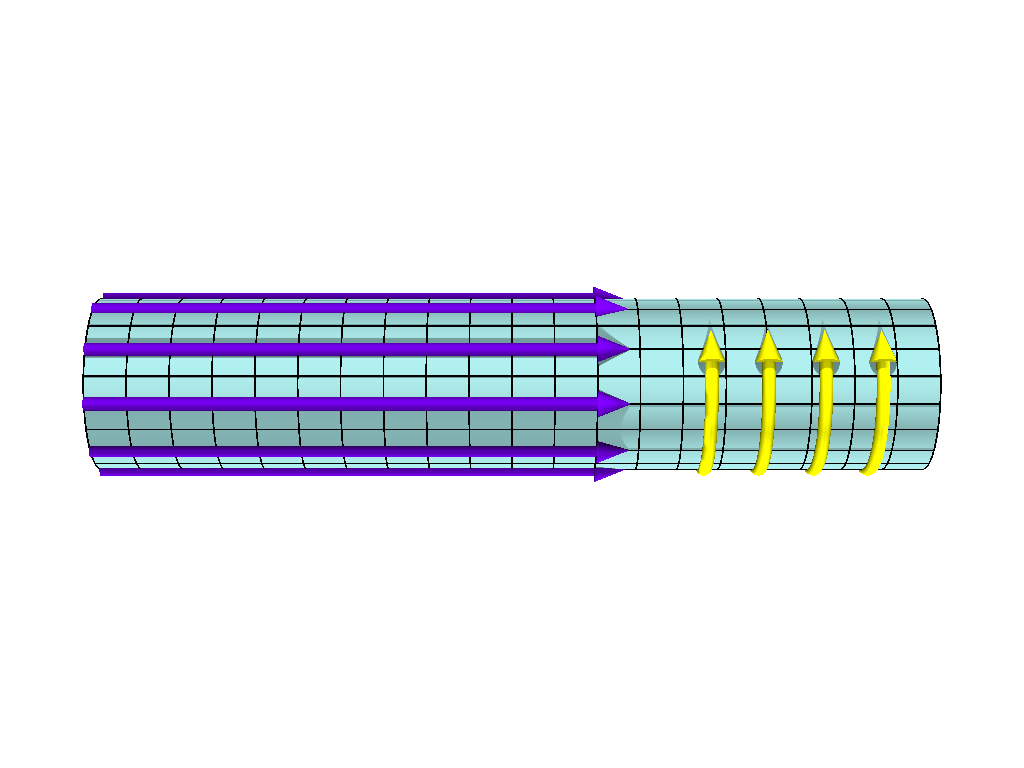
A sketch of the θ-pinch equilibrium. The z-directed magnetic field corresponds to a θ-directed plasma current.

The θ-pinch has a magnetic field directed in the z direction and a large diamagnetic current directed in the θ direction. Using Ampère's circuital law (discarding the displacement term)

$$\begin{align}
\vec{B} &= B_z(r)\hat{z} \\
\mu_0 \vec{J} &= \nabla \times \vec{B} \\
&= \frac{1}{r} \frac{d}{d \theta}B_z(r) \hat{r} - \frac{d}{dr}B_z(r) \hat{\theta}
\end{align}$$

Since B is only a function of r we can simplify this to

$$\mu_0 \vec{J} = -\frac{d}{dr}B_z(r) \hat{\theta}$$

So J points in the θ direction.

Thus, the equilibrium condition ($\nabla p = \mathbf{j}\times\mathbf{B}$) for the θ-pinch reads:

$$\frac{d}{d r} \left( p + \frac{B_z^2}{2\mu_0} \right) = 0$$

θ-pinches tend to be resistant to plasma instabilities; This is due in part to Alfvén's theorem (also known as the frozen-in flux theorem).

==== The Z-pinch ====
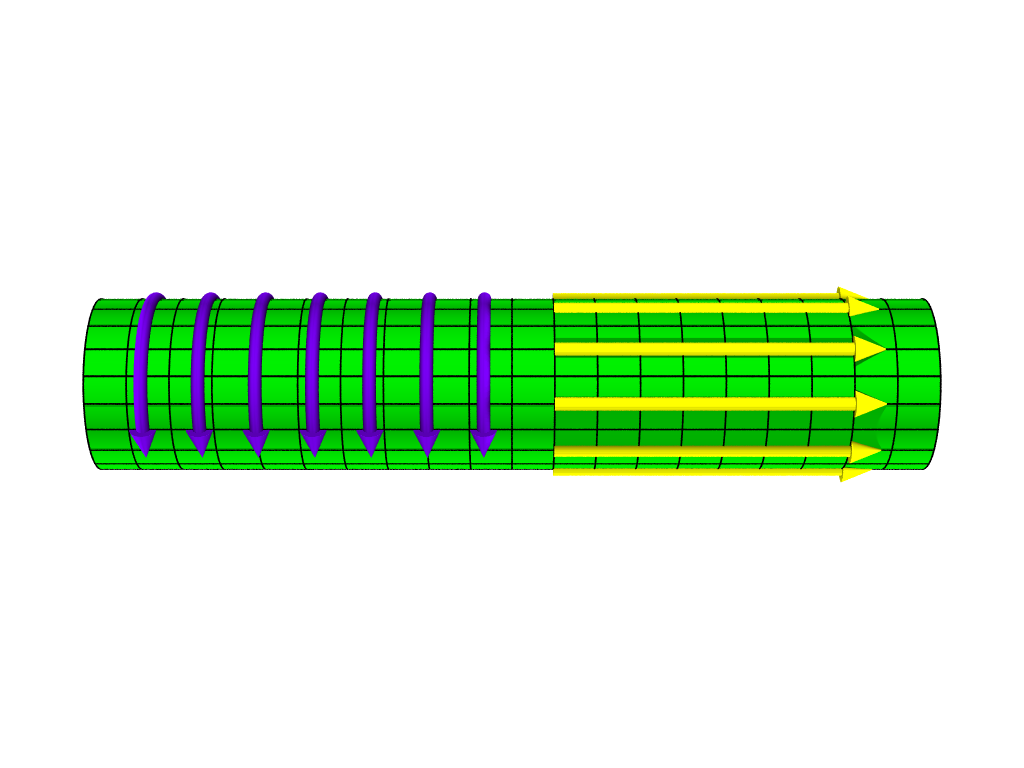
A sketch of the Z-pinch equilibrium. A θ-directed magnetic field corresponds to a z-directed plasma current.

The Z-pinch has a magnetic field in the θ direction and a current J flowing in the z direction. Again, by electrostatic Ampère's law,

$$\begin{align}
\vec{B} &= B_{\theta}(r)\hat{\theta} \\
\mu_0 \vec{J} &= \nabla \times \vec{B} \\
&= \frac{1}{r}\frac{d}{dr}\left(r B_\theta(r)\right) \hat{z} - \frac{d}{dz}B_\theta(r) \hat{r} \\
&= \frac{1}{r}\frac{d}{dr}\left(r B_\theta(r)\right) \hat{z}
\end{align}$$

Thus, the equilibrium condition, $\nabla p = \mathbf{j}\times\mathbf{B}$, for the Z-pinch reads:

$$\frac{d}{d r} \left( p + \frac{B_\theta^2}{2\mu_0} \right) + \frac{B_\theta^2}{\mu_0 r} = 0$$

Although Z-pinches satisfy the MHD equilibrium condition, this is an unstable equilibrium, resulting in various instabilies such as the m = 0 instability ('sausage'), m = 1 instability ('kink'), and various other higher order instabilities.

==== The screw pinch ====
The screw pinch is an effort to combine the stability aspects of the θ-pinch and the confinement aspects of the Z-pinch. Referring once again to Ampère's law,

$$\nabla \times \vec{B} = \mu_0 \vec{J}$$

But this time, the B field has a θ component and a z component

$$\begin{align}
\vec{B} &= B_\theta \hat{\theta} + B_z \hat{z} \\
\mu_0 \vec{J} &= \frac{1}{r}\frac{d}{dr}\left(r B_\theta\right) \hat{z} - \frac{d}{dr}B_z \hat{\theta}
\end{align}$$

So this time J has a component in the z direction and a component in the θ direction.

Finally, the equilibrium condition ($\nabla p = \mathbf{j}\times\mathbf{B}$) for the screw pinch reads:

$$\frac{d}{d r} \left(p + \frac{B_z^2 + B_\theta^2}{2 \mu_0} \right) + \frac{B_\theta^2}{\mu_0 r} = 0$$

==== The screw pinch via colliding optical vortices ====
The screw pinch might be produced in laser plasma by colliding optical vortices of ultrashort duration. For this purpose optical vortices should be phase-conjugated. The magnetic field distribution is given here again via Ampère's law:

$$\nabla \times \vec{B} = \mu_0 \vec{J}$$

=== Two dimensions ===
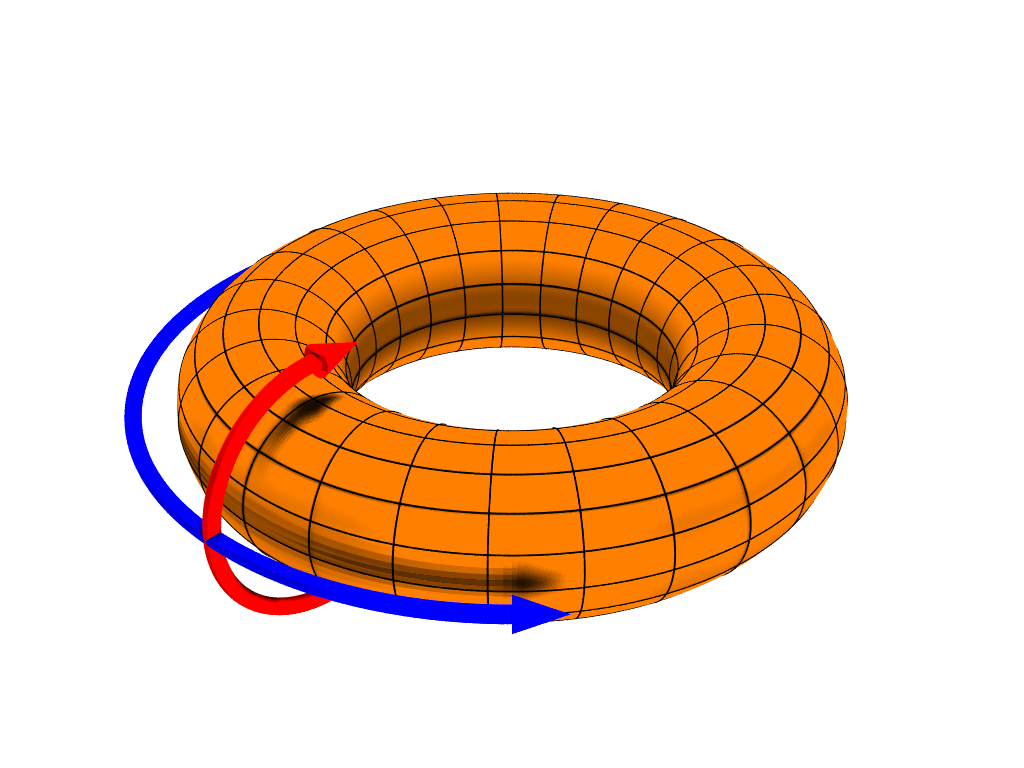
A toroidal coordinate system in common use in plasma physics. The red arrow denotes the poloidal direction (θ) The blue arrow denotes the toroidal direction (φ)

A common problem with one-dimensional pinches is the end losses. Most of the motion of particles is along the magnetic field. With the θ-pinch and the screw-pinch, this leads particles out of the end of the machine very quickly, leading to a loss of mass and energy. Along with this problem, the Z-pinch has major stability problems. Though particles can be reflected to some extent with magnetic mirrors, even these allow many particles to pass. A common method of beating these end losses, is to bend the cylinder around into a torus. Unfortunately this breaks θ symmetry, as paths on the inner portion (inboard side) of the torus are shorter than similar paths on the outer portion (outboard side). Thus, a new theory is needed. This gives rise to the famous Grad–Shafranov equation. Numerical solutions to the Grad–Shafranov equation have also yielded some equilibria, most notably that of the reversed field pinch.

=== Three dimensions ===
As of 2015, there is no coherent analytical theory for three-dimensional equilibria. The general approach to finding such equilibria is to solve the vacuum ideal MHD equations. Numerical solutions have yielded designs for stellarators. Some machines take advantage of simplification techniques such as helical symmetry (for example University of Wisconsin's Helically Symmetric eXperiment). However, for an arbitrary three-dimensional configuration, an equilibrium relation, similar to that of the 1-D configurations exists:

$$\nabla_\perp \left( p + \frac{B^2}{2 \mu_0} \right) - \frac{B^2}{\mu_0 }\vec{\kappa} = 0$$

Where κ is the curvature vector defined as:

$$\vec{\kappa} = \left(\vec{b} \cdot \nabla\right)\vec{b}$$

with b the unit vector tangent to B.

== Formal treatment ==
A stream of water pinching into droplets has been suggested as an analogy to the electromagnetic pinch. Gravity accelerates free-falling water which causes the water column to constrict. Surface tension breaks the narrowing water column into droplets (not shown, see Plateau–Rayleigh instability). This is analogous to the magnetic field suggested as the cause of pinching in bead lightning. The morphology (shape) is similar to the so-called sausage instability in plasma.

=== The Bennett relation ===
Consider a cylindrical column of fully ionized quasineutral plasma, with an axial electric field, producing an axial current density, j, and associated azimuthal magnetic field, B. As the current flows through its own magnetic field, a pinch is generated with an inward radial force density of j x B. In a steady state with forces balancing:

$$\nabla p = \nabla(p_e+p_i) = \mathbf{j}\times\mathbf{B}$$

where ∇p is the magnetic pressure gradient, and p_{e} and p_{i} are the electron and ion pressures, respectively. Then using Maxwell's equation $\nabla\times\mathbf{B} = \mu_0\mathbf{j}$ and the ideal gas law $p=nkT$, we derive:

$$2 N k(Z_i T_e + T_i) = \frac{{\mu_0}} {4 \pi} I^2$$,

where N is the number of ions per unit length along the axis, Z_{i} is the ion charge state, T_{e} and T_{i} are the electron and ion temperatures, I is the total beam current, and k is the Boltzmann constant.

=== The generalized Bennett relation ===
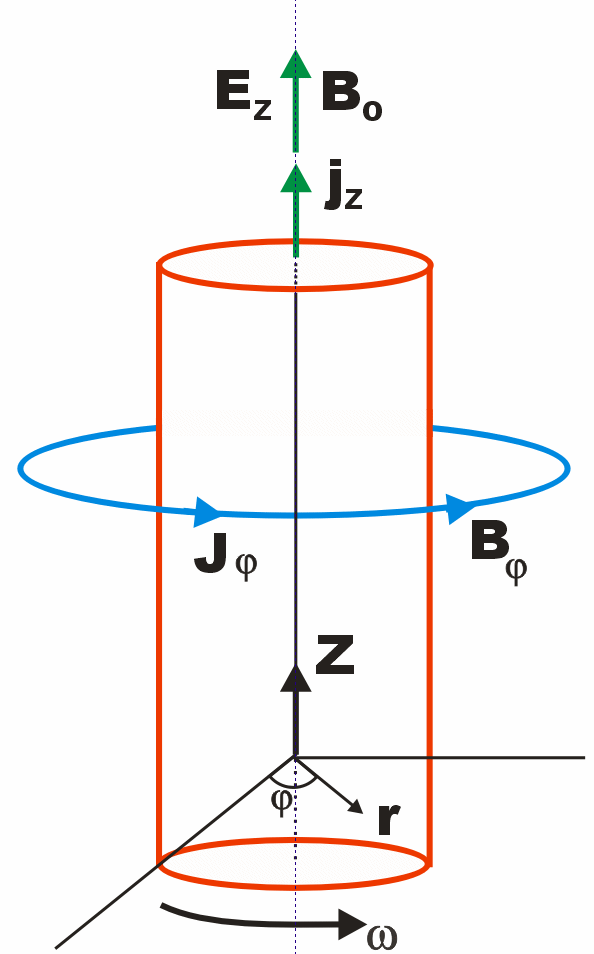
The generalized Bennett relation considers a current-carrying magnetic-field-aligned cylindrical plasma pinch undergoing rotation at angular frequency ω

The generalized Bennett relation considers a current-carrying magnetic-field-aligned cylindrical plasma pinch undergoing rotation at angular frequency ω. Along the axis of the plasma cylinder flows a current density j_{z}, resulting in an azimuthal magnetic field Β_{φ}. Originally derived by Witalis, the generalized Bennett relation results in:

$$\begin{align}
\frac{1}{4} \frac{\partial^2 J_0}{\partial t^2} = {} &W_{\perp \text{kin}} + \Delta W_{E_z} + \Delta W_{B_z} + \Delta W_k - \frac{{\mu_0}} {8 \pi} I^2 (a) \\[8pt]
& {} - \frac{1}{2}G\overline{m}^2 N^2 (a) + \frac{1}{2}\pi a^2 \epsilon_0 \left(E_r^2 (a) - E_\phi^2 (a) \right)\\
\end{align}$$

- where a current-carrying, magnetic-field-aligned cylindrical plasma has a radius a,
- J_{0} is the total moment of inertia with respect to the z axis,
- W_{⊥kin} is the kinetic energy per unit length due to beam motion transverse to the beam axis
- W_{B_{z}} is the self-consistent B_{z} energy per unit length
- W_{E_{z}} is the self-consistent E_{z} energy per unit length
- W_{k} is thermokinetic energy per unit length
- I(a) is the axial current inside the radius a (r in diagram)
- N(a) is the total number of particles per unit length
- E_{r} is the radial electric field
- E_{φ} is the rotational electric field

The positive terms in the equation are expansional forces while the negative terms represent beam compressional forces.

=== The Carlqvist relation ===
The Carlqvist relation, published by Per Carlqvist in 1988, is a specialization of the generalized Bennett relation (above), for the case that the kinetic pressure is much smaller at the border of the pinch than in the inner parts. It takes the form

$$\frac{{\mu_0}} {8 \pi} I^2 (a) +\frac{1}{2}G\overline{m}^2 N^2 (a) = \Delta W_{B_z} + \Delta W_k$$

and is applicable to many space plasmas.

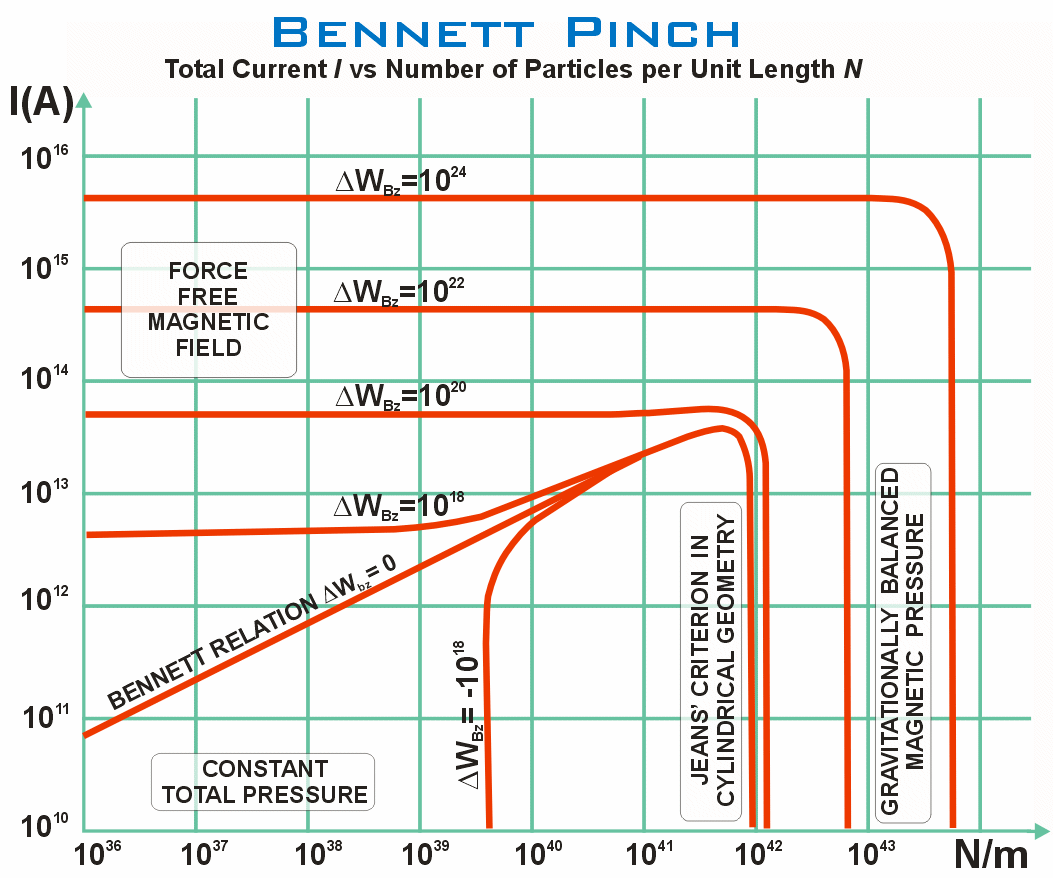
The Bennett pinch showing the total current (I) versus the number of particles per unit length (N). The chart illustrates four physically distinct regions. The plasma temperature is 20 K, the mean particle mass 3×10^{−27} kg, and ΔW_{Bz} is the excess magnetic energy per unit length due to the axial magnetic field B_{z}. The plasma is assumed to be non-rotational, and the kinetic pressure at the edges is much smaller than inside.

The Carlqvist relation can be illustrated (see right), showing the total current (I) versus the number of particles per unit length (N) in a Bennett pinch. The chart illustrates four physically distinct regions. The plasma temperature is quite cold (T_{i} = T_{e} = T_{n} = 20 K), containing mainly hydrogen with a mean particle mass 3×10^{−27} kg. The thermokinetic energy W_{k} >> πa^{2} p_{k}(a). The curves, ΔW_{Bz} show different amounts of excess magnetic energy per unit length due to the axial magnetic field B_{z}. The plasma is assumed to be non-rotational, and the kinetic pressure at the edges is much smaller than inside.

Chart regions: (a) In the top-left region, the pinching force dominates. (b) Towards the bottom, outward kinetic pressures balance inwards magnetic pressure, and the total pressure is constant. (c) To the right of the vertical line ΔW_{Bz} = 0, the magnetic pressures balances the gravitational pressure, and the pinching force is negligible. (d) To the left of the sloping curve ΔW_{Bz} = 0, the gravitational force is negligible. Note that the chart shows a special case of the Carlqvist relation, and if it is replaced by the more general Bennett relation, then the designated regions of the chart are not valid.

Carlqvist further notes that by using the relations above, and a derivative, it is possible to describe the Bennett pinch, the Jeans criterion (for gravitational instability, in one and two dimensions), force-free magnetic fields, gravitationally balanced magnetic pressures, and continuous transitions between these states.

== References in culture ==
A fictionalized pinch-generating device was used in Ocean's Eleven, where it was used to disrupt Las Vegas's power grid just long enough for the characters to begin their heist.

== See also ==
- Electromagnetic forming
- Explosively pumped flux compression generator
- Fusion power
- Madison Symmetric Torus (reversed field pinch)
