= Explosive-driven ferromagnetic generator =

An explosive-driven ferromagnetic generator (EDFMG, explosively pumped ferromagnetic generator, EPFMG, or FMG) is a compact pulsed power generator, a device used for generation of short high-voltage high-current pulse by releasing energy stored in a permanent magnet. It is suited for delivering high-current pulses (kiloamperes) to low-impedance loads.

The FMGs consist of a permanent magnet (usually a neodymium magnet), a high explosive charge, and a pickup coil. They are a kind of phase transition generators, utilizing pressure-induced magnetic phase transition effect. By adjusting the number of turns of the coil, which can be as low as a single turn, the generator can be designed for delivery of high-current low-voltage pulses or, with more turns, low-current high-voltage pulses.

The shock wave generated by explosion destroys the magnetic domains in the magnet, cause loss of the magnetic field, and the very sudden change induces a high-peak electric current in the surrounding coil. Both the shock wave directions parallel to the vector of magnetization (longitudinal) and perpendicular (transverse) are possible to be used. One of the possible configurations is a ring magnet with the explosive charge in its center.

EDFMGs are especially well suited as seed power sources for explosively pumped flux compression generators and can be used for charging capacitor banks.

A generator coupling an EDFMG containing an 8.75 cm^{3} of magnetic material with a spiral vector inversion generator yielded a pulse of amplitude over 40 kilovolts with a rise time of 6.2 nanoseconds. Generators delivering pulses over 50 kV and 5 kA were demonstrated.

Ultra-compact generators with diameter less than 50 mm were developed.

== See also ==
- Explosive-driven ferroelectric generator
