= EMPT =

EMPT may refer to:

- Electromagnetic Pulse Technology
- Emergency Medical Technician: Paramedic
