= Chamberlin Hall =

Coordinates: 43°04′25.8″N 89°24′19.3″W

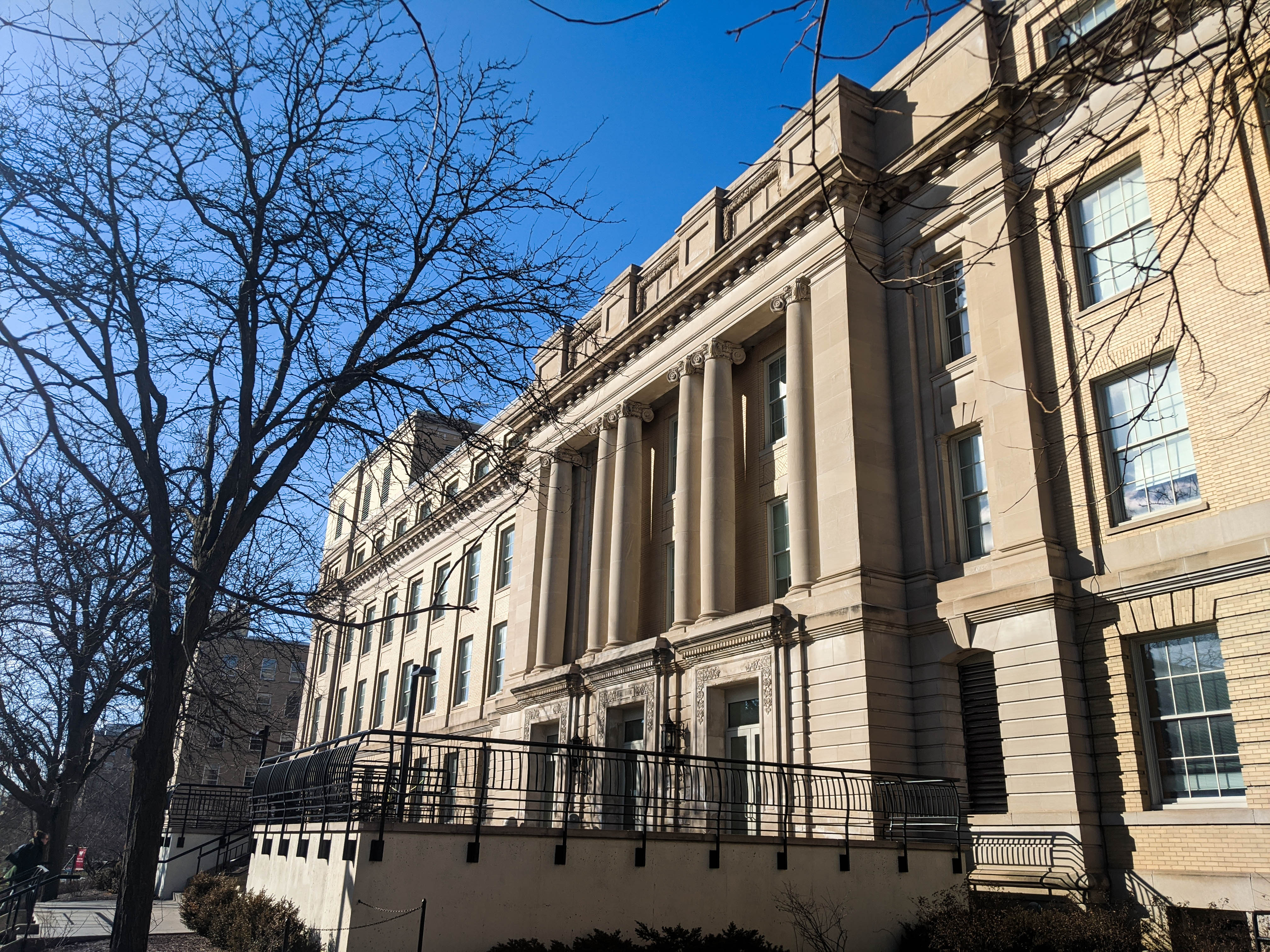
- Interactive map of the Chamberlin Hall area

General information
- Architectural style: Neoclassical
- Location: 1150 University Ave. Madison, Wisconsin
- Opened: 1905

Design and construction
- Architects: J. T. W. Jennings, Arthur Peabody

Chamberlin Hall is home of the University of Wisconsin-Madison Physics Department, located on the main campus in Madison, Wisconsin. The L.R. Ingersoll Physics Museum is hosted on the second floor.

== History ==
Chamberlin Hall was built in the early 1900s, then fully renovated and reconstructed in 2002. It was formerly home to the Chemistry department and is named after Thomas Chrowder Chamberlin, president of the University of Wisconsin from 1887 to 1892.
