= Reversed-Field eXperiment =

Reversed-field pinch device

Coordinates: 45.3912°N 11.9298°E

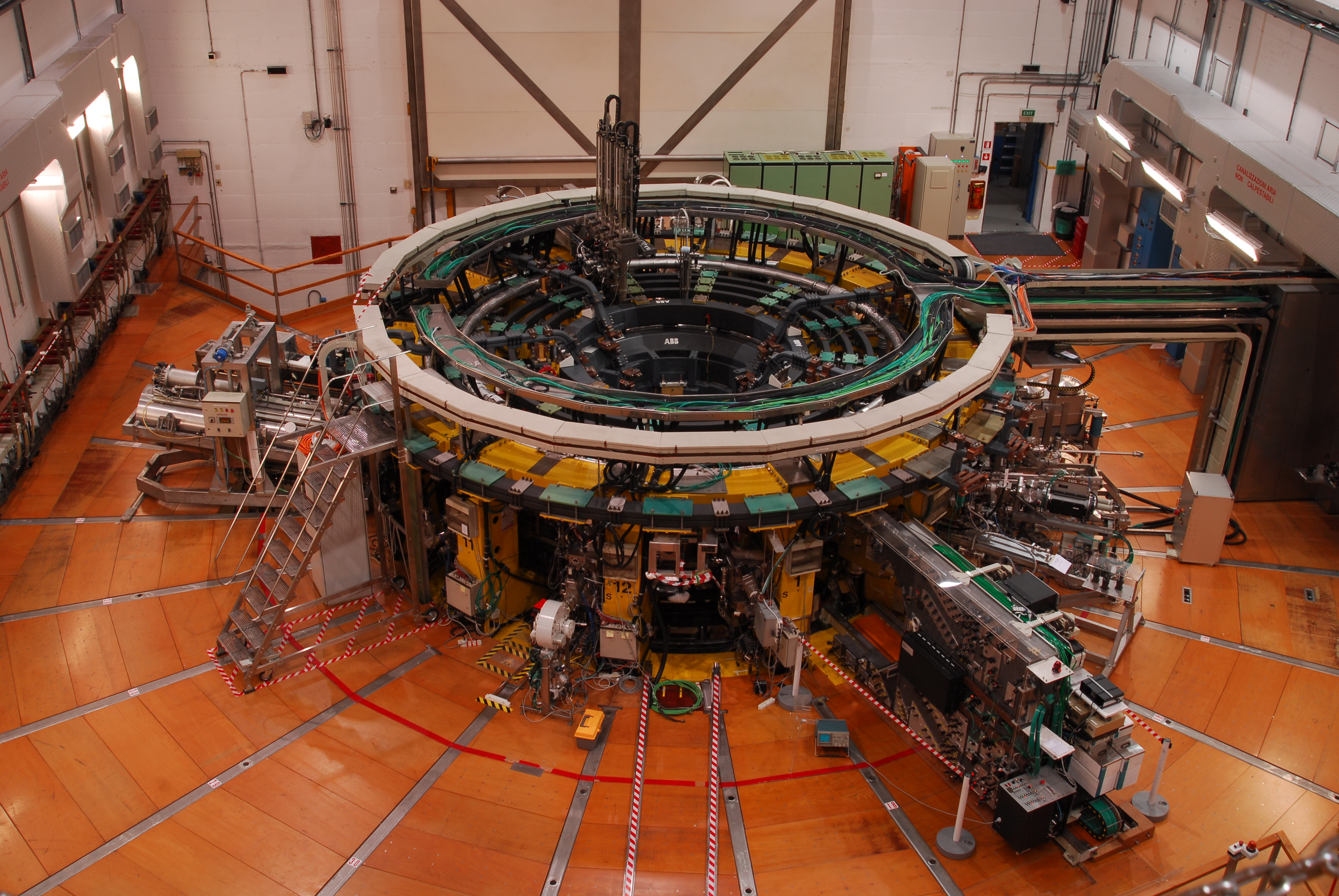
RFX in 2007

The Reversed-Field eXperiment (RFX) is the largest reversed field pinch device presently in operation, situated in Padua, Italy. It was constructed from 1985 to 1991, and has been in operation since 1992.

The experiments carried out in the last two decades with two large RFP machines (MST in Madison, Wisconsin and RFX in Padova) provided new insight on the physical phenomena taking place in magnetically confined plasma dynamics.

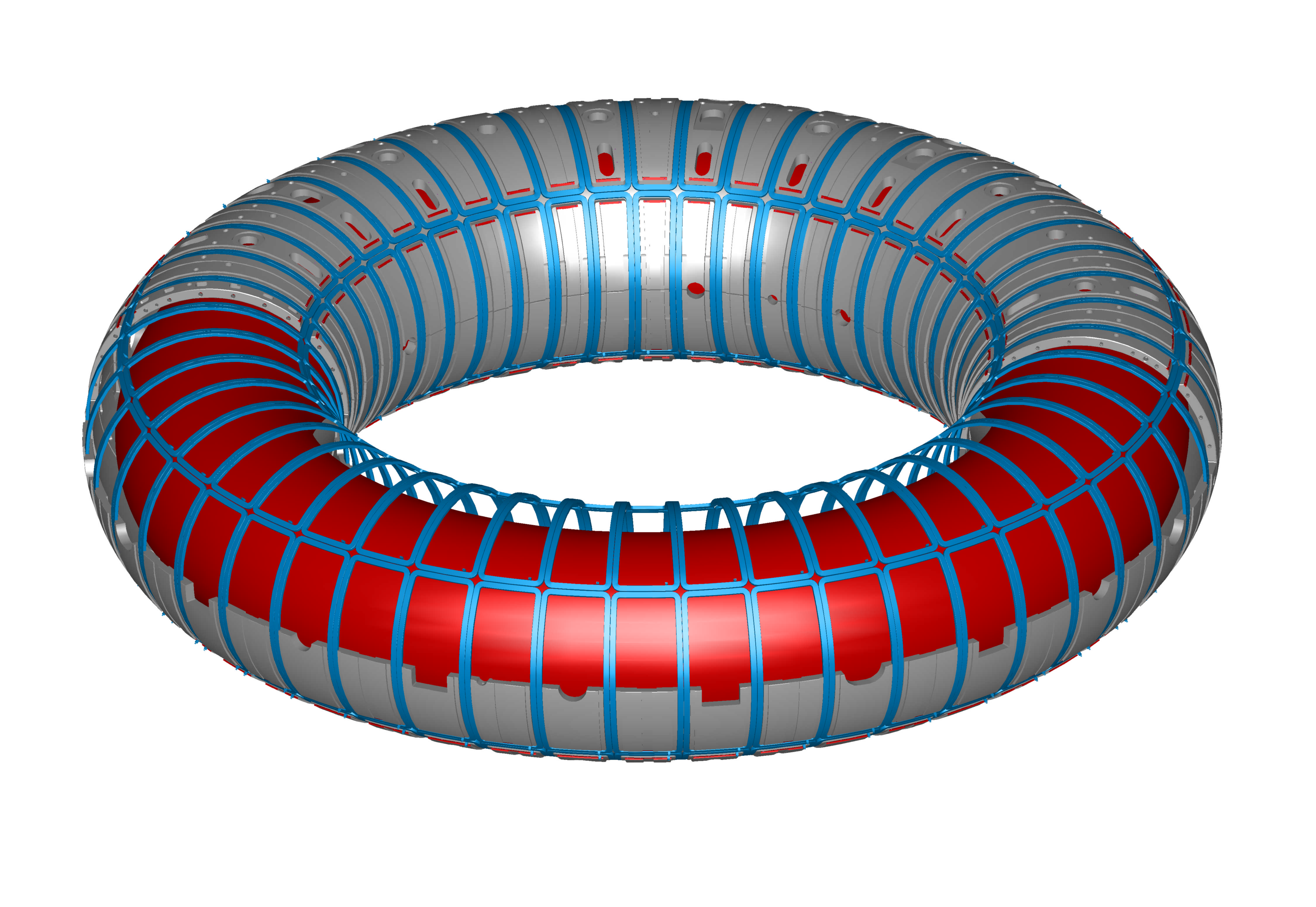
192 saddle coils for the active feedback in RFX-mod 2

RFX was built between 1985 and 1991. In RFX, an extremely high current is induced (up to 2 MA); combined with a voltage on the toroidal turn of 20 Volts, 40 MW are dissipated during the discharge, so that heating systems are not mandatory. In the period 2001–2004, RFX was modified (RFX-mod) to introduce an active control system based on 192 saddle coils surrounding the torus, active with characteristic feedback times greater than 50 ms. It is the first large-scale machine, of the RFP type, that reaches plasma currents of 2 MA and sustains them for about half a second. Since 2015 it is being upgraded.

== See also ==
- Madison Symmetric Torus
