= Madison Symmetric Torus =

Fusion device for physics experiments

MST
Madison Symmetric Torus
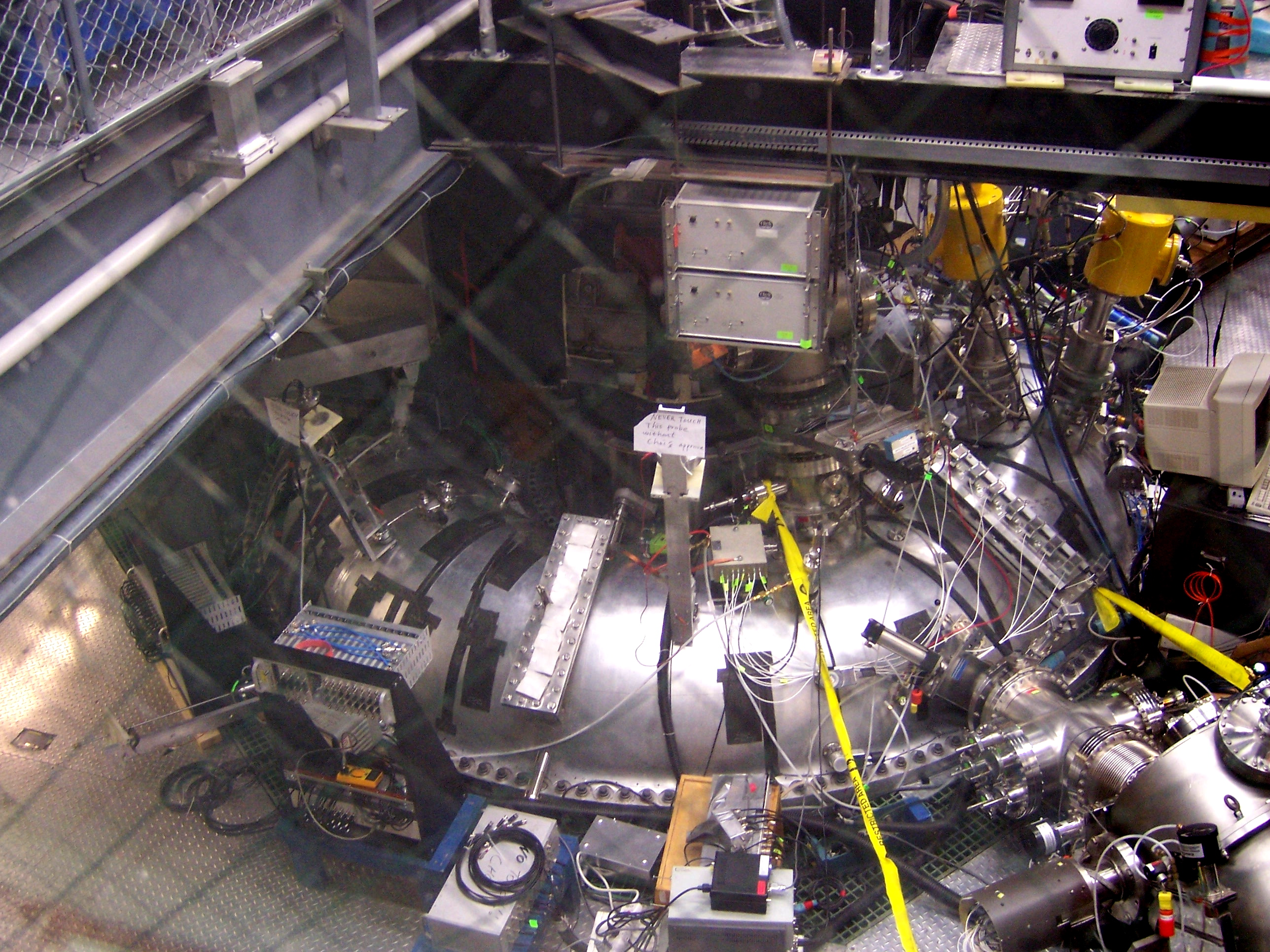
- Device type: Reversed field pinch
- Location: Madison, Wisconsin, US
- Affiliation: University of Wisconsin–Madison

Links
- Website: MST official website

The Madison Symmetric Torus (MST) is a reversed field pinch (RFP) physics experiment with applications to both fusion energy research and astrophysical plasmas.

MST is operated by the Wisconsin Plasma Physics Laboratory and is located inside Thomas C. Chamberlin Hall at the University of Wisconsin–Madison.

RFPs are significantly different from tokamaks (the most popular magnetic confinement scheme) in that they tend to have a higher power density and better confinement characteristics for a given average magnetic field. RFPs also tend to be dominated by non-ideal phenomena and turbulent effects.

== Classification ==
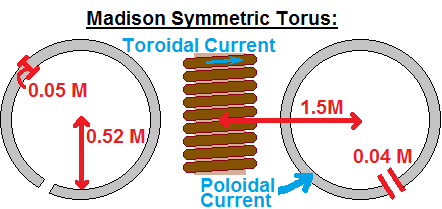
The geometry inside the Madison Symmetric Torus.

As in most such experiments, the MST plasma is a toroidal pinch, which means the plasma is shaped like a donut and confined by a magnetic field generated by a large current flowing through it. MST falls into an unconventional class of machine called a reversed field pinch (RFP.) The RFP is so named because the toroidal magnetic field that permeates the plasma spontaneously reverses direction near the edge.

A reversed field pinch is formed similarly to other toroidal pinch devices, by driving current through the plasma from an associated capacitor bank or other high-current power sources. In a tokamak the toroidal field is much stronger than the poloidal field, but in an RFP it's just the opposite. In fact, in an RFP the externally applied toroidal field is switched off shortly after startup.

The plasma in an RFP is also much closer to the wall than in a tokamak. This permits a peculiar arrangement of the magnetic field lines, which will 'relax' into a new state such that the total magnetic energy in the plasma is minimized and the total magnetic helicity is conserved. The relaxed state called a Taylor state is marked by a peculiar arrangement of magnetic field lines where the toroidal magnetic field at the edge spontaneously reverses direction.

== Ongoing experiments in the MST program ==
=== Oscillating field current drive ===
Like most toroidal confinement schemes, the RFP relies on a transient burst of current to create the plasma and the magnetic fields that confine it. But for the RFP to be a viable fusion energy candidate the plasma must be sustained by a steady state current source. OFCD is a scheme for driving a steady current in a relaxed plasma by adding sizable oscillating perturbations to the toroidal and poloidal fields injecting both power and helicity into the plasma. A similar approach was patented and suggested for the Lockheed-Martin Compact Fusion Reactor.

A nonlinear reaction in the plasma combines the two oscillations in such a way that, on average, a steady current is maintained.

=== Pellet injection ===
One of the challenges facing the RFP is fueling the hot core of the plasma directly, rather than relying on the deuterium gas to seep in slowly from the edge. The Pellet Injector fires a frozen pellet of deuterium into the plasma using a blast of gas or a mechanical punch. The pellet is vaporized and ionized as it travels into the core of the plasma.

=== Pulsed poloidal current drive ===
Every gradient is a source of free energy, especially if it's across a magnetic field. In MST the current is stronger in the core than at the edge. This peaked current profile serves as a source of free energy for magnetic fluctuations culminating in violent events in the plasma called sawteeth.

PPCD alleviates this effect by driving a current at the edge of the plasma, flattening the current profile. Small pulses are added to the power supply currents that drive the toroidal field. The resultant pulsed toroidal magnetic field, with the aid of Faraday's law, creates a poloidal electric field and hence a poloidal current. A great deal of research on MST is devoted to the study of this effect and its application for enhanced confinement.

=== Neutral beam injection ===
In order to initiate a sustained fusion reaction, it is usually necessary to use many methods to heat the plasma. Neutral Beam Injection (NBI) involves injecting a high energy beam of neutral atoms, typically hydrogen or deuterium, into the core of the plasma. These energetic atoms transfer their energy to the plasma, raising the overall temperature. The neutral atoms injected don't remain neutral.

As the beam passes through the plasma, the atoms are ionized as they bounce off the ions in the plasma. Because the magnetic field inside the torus is bent into a circle, the fast ions are hoped to be confined in the background plasma. The confined fast ions are slowed down by the background plasma, the same way air resistance slows down a baseball. The energy transfer from the fast ions to the plasma increases the plasma temperature. The actual injector can be seen from the observation window. It looks like a long silver cylinder laying on its side but tilted slightly downward against the torus near the back of the machine. When the injector is pulsed, 20,000 volts accelerates the beam to about 30 amperes of current for about 1.5 milliseconds.

Problems would occur if the fast ions aren't confined within the plasma long enough for them to deposit their energy. Magnetic fluctuations bedevil plasma confinement in this type of device by scrambling what we hoped were well behaved magnetic fields. If the fast ions are susceptible to this type of behavior, they can escape very quickly. However, there is evidence to suggest that they aren't.

=== Electron Bernstein wave current drive ===
EBW is an acronym for Electron Bernstein Wave and is named after the plasma physicist, Ira Bernstein.

Bernstein Wave Mode relates to a method of injecting ion or electron energy (IBW or EBW) into a plasma to increase its temperature in an attempt to reach fusion conditions. A plasma is a phase of matter which occurs naturally during lightning and electrical discharges and which is created artificially in fusion reactors to produce extremely high temperatures.

This is an experiment on the MST to heat the plasma and to drive electric current inside the plasma.

There is a large electric current in the plasma inside this machine; it is responsible for creating the necessary magnetic fields to make the reversed field pinch configuration. It also heats the plasma very quickly — the same way wires inside your toaster get hot. Your toaster probably uses about 10 ampere of current, while the plasma in MST is heated by up to 600,000 amperes. But even though the plasma reaches over 10,000,000 degrees Fahrenheit, it is not hot enough for practical fusion energy and we need to find other ways to deposit energy into the plasma. The EBW is a way to inject microwave power to further heat the plasma. The standard microwave oven produces around 1 kW of power at a frequency of 2.45 GHz; the EBW experiment is currently producing 150 kW at 3.6 GHz, and it is a goal of the team to upgrade to over 2 MW. To generate this type of power (on a low budget), decommissioned military radar equipment and home-made voltage power supplies are used.

The second (and perhaps more scientifically important) goal of the EBW experiment is to drive electric current in a prescribed place within the plasma. The main plasma current distributes itself naturally, and the plasma tends to concentrate current into the center, leaving less current near the edge. This can lead to instability of the plasma. It has been shown (both theoretically and by experiments in the Madison Symmetric Torus) that driving current in the edge makes the plasma more stable to fluctuations in the magnetic field, resulting in better confinement of the hot plasma and leading to much higher temperature. Using the EBW to drive this stabilizing current would be a very important scientific result. The ability to deposit very specifically the auxiliary current gives us the opportunity to optimize our current drive schemes. The heating is also very localized, allowing us to study how hot (at least locally) the plasma can become within this magnetic confinement scheme — in plasma physics terms, this is called finding the beta limit. This is an unanswered question for the RFP and will give insight on whether or not this type of machine could be scaled up to a cost-effective, efficient fusion reactor.

=== The heavy ion beam probe ===
The Heavy Ion Beam Probe (HIBP) fires potassium ions into the plasma. By measuring their trajectory we get a profile of several key properties inside the plasma.

This versatile diagnostics tool has been used in magnetic confinement fusion experiments to determine the electric potential, electron density, electron temperature, and magnetic vector potential of the plasma.

A stream of sodium ions (the primary beam) is injected from the ion gun across the magnetic field into the plasma. As the singly charged particles pass through the plasma, they are further ionized creating the doubly charged secondary beam.

The secondaries are then detected and analyzed outside the plasma. By curving the trajectories, the magnetic field separates secondary ions from primary ions. Because of this, only secondaries ionized at a given plasma position reach a given detector location. This allows the HIBP to make measurements localized to the ionization position. The secondary current is related to local electron density and the ionization cross-section of the primary ions, which is itself a function of the electron temperature. The electric potential can be obtained from the energy difference between primary and secondary ion beams. The energy of the secondary beam can be determined from the angle at which it enters the energy analyzer.

The MST-HIBP system consists of:

1. A 200 keV electrostatic accelerator that forms, focuses and accelerates the diagnostic ion beam;
2. The primary and secondary beamlines with sweep systems that provide beam transmission and steering;
3. An electrostatic analyzer that measures the energy, intensity and position of the secondary beam;
4. Auxiliary components and systems which include the primary beam detectors and the plasma/UV suppression structures, etc.

=== Far infrared polarimetry-interferometry system ===
FIR, or far infrared, refers to light with wavelengths between 1 and 10 mm. The FIR system in MST is based on the FIR lasers enclosed in the beige-colored laser safety room to the right of the picture shown, in the second floor hallway.

There are four FIR lasers in the system. One is a CO_{2} laser which produces a continuous power of about 120 W. This beam is then split in three. Each beam optically pumps a formic acid vapor laser operating at a wavelength of 432.6 mm, and a power of about 20 mW. The FIR system has 2 modes of operation: interferometry and polarimetry.

What does FIR diagnostic system measure?

The electron density, plasma current density, and magnetic field are three important plasma parameters of MST. The FIR system is used to measure their spatial and temporal distributions.

How does FIR interferometry work?

Like glass, a plasma has a refractive index different from that of vacuum (or air) that depends on plasma electron density.

We send one laser beam through the plasma (the probe beam), one through the air (the reference beam), and measure the phase difference between them. This experimental configuration is called a Mach-Zehnder interferometer. The measured phase is proportional to the average plasma electron density along the beam path.

In MST, we send multiple probe beams (blue lines in the figure) through the plasma at different radii. We then apply the Abel inversion technique to obtain a profile of the plasma electron density.

How does FIR polarimetry work?

A plasma is also an optically active media, meaning when a linearly polarized electromagnetic wave is propagating parallel (or anti-parallel) to the magnetic field, the polarization of the wave exiting the plasma will rotate a small angle.

This is called Faraday rotation, and the angle is called the Faraday rotation angle. The FIR system measures the Faraday rotation, which is proportional to the line average of the electron density times the magnetic field component parallel to the beam path.

The reason for Faraday rotation is as follows: When a linearly polarized wave is propagating along a magnetic field line, it is de-composed into left-hand and right-hand circularly polarized components. The phase difference between them as they exit the plasma causes the recombined linearly polarized wave to rotate its polarization direction. In MST, we launch two co-propagating, counter-rotating waves to probe the plasma. We then measure the phase difference between these two beams, which will be twice the Faraday rotation angle.

In the figure, each of the 11 blue probe beams is a combination of two counter-rotating, circularly polarized beams, measuring the Faraday rotation angles along the same chords as the interferometer does. The combined interferometer phases and Faraday rotation angles can then be combined to determine the poloidal magnetic field distribution. Using Ampere's law, the toroidal plasma current can be determined as well.

How well does the FIR diagnostic system work?

The FIR system for MST is very precise. The Faraday rotation angle for MST plasmas is typically within 5 degrees. To measure such small signal, we have achieved an accuracy of 0.06 degree. The temporal resolution is less than 1 microsecond.

What are some of the research topics related to FIR?

FIR is an essential tool for most of the research topics in MST since it provides information about the basic plasma parameters. The system measures electron density, toroidal current, poloidal magnetic field, and the spatial profiles of each.

Currently, we are exploring the possibility of measuring toroidal magnetic field and poloidal plasma current by using the plasma bi-refringence effect, or the Cotton-Mouton effect. When a linearly polarized EM wave is propagating perpendicular to the magnetic field, the refractive index depends on whether the wave polarization is parallel or perpendicular to the magnetic field direction.

Why choose FIR lasers?

For plasma polarimetry-interferometry, the wavelength we chose is sufficiently long to provide measurable plasma induced phase changes, but sufficiently short to avoid complicated plasma-wave interactions, including the bending of the beam. There are many high power molecular laser lines available in this wavelength range, and many commercially available detectors.

=== Thomson scattering ===
What is Thomson Scattering?

Thomson scattering is the result of a collision between a photon (an electromagnetic wave) and a charged particle, such as an electron. When an electron and photon "collide" the electron feels a Lorentz force from the oscillating electric and magnetic fields of the photon and is accelerated. This acceleration causes the electron to emit a different photon in a different direction. This emitted photon has a wavelength shifted from that of the incident photon by an amount dependent on the electron energy. Another way of looking at this is that the electron absorbs the energy of the photon and re emits the energy in the form of a different electromagnetic wave. This scattering of a photon by an electron is called Thomson Scattering.

How is Thomson Scattering useful to plasma physicists?

Since the wavelength of the scattered photon depends on the energy of the scattering electron, Thomson scattering is good way to measure the energy of an electron. This is done by creating a photon of known wavelength and measuring the wavelength of the scattered photon. The Thomson Scattering configuration at MST uses a 1064 nm Nd:YAG laser system, which produces the best time-resolution electron temperature readings in the world. We create our photons with high power lasers that we shine into a window on the top of the MST, and collect scattered photons with a large collection lens on the side of the MST.

The wavelength distribution of the scattered photons tells us the energy distribution of the electrons in the plasma, giving us a direct unobtrusive way of getting the temperature of the electrons. The amount of photons we actually collect can also tell us something about the density of the electrons in the plasma.

=== Charge exchange recombination spectroscopy and ion Doppler spectroscopy ===
Fusion plasmas are typically generated from ionization of a neutral gas. In most cases, deuterium is used as the plasma fuel. These plasmas are therefore primarily made up of deuterium ions (plus electrons), and it is necessary to diagnose the behavior of these ions if the relevant plasma physics is to be understood. However, in any fusion device, other types of ions ("impurities") are also present. These exist naturally due to the inability to achieve a perfect vacuum in a fusion reactor before fueling. Thus, materials such as water vapor, nitrogen, and carbon will be found in small amounts in typical plasma discharges. Impurities may also be generated during plasma discharges due to plasma-wall interactions.

These interactions primarily cause material from the wall to be ejected into the plasma through sputtering. In the Madison Symmetric Torus (MST), properties of the impurity ions (e.g. carbon, oxygen, etc.) are closely linked to properties of the deuterium ions as a result of strong interaction between the ion species. Thus, impurity ion measurements can, in principle, provide direct information about the deuterium ions. Measurements of the impurity ion temperature (T_{i}) and flow velocity (v_{i}) are obtained on MST using Charge Exchange Recombination Spectroscopy, or CHERS.

The CHERS process can be broken down into two separate steps: Charge Exchange and Radiative Decay. In the first stage, an electron is transferred from a neutral atom (e.g. deuterium) to an impurity ion that has no electrons (e.g. C^{+6}). During this transfer, the electron typically winds up in an excited state (high energy level) of the impurity ion. As the electron decays down to the ground state (minimum energy level), energy conservation requires radiation to be emitted by the impurity ion. This emission has discrete values of energy, or wavelength, which correspond to the energy differences between the initial and final atomic levels of a particular electron transition. For example, consider charge exchange between a deuterium atom and a C^{+6} ion: if the electron is transferred to the n=7 energy level of the carbon ion, then the ion will emit radiation at discrete energies given by the difference in energy between the n=7 and n=6 levels, the n=6 and n=5 levels, the n=5 and n=4 levels, and so on (down to n=1). This line emission is Doppler-broadened as a result of ion thermal motion, and Doppler-shifted as a result of ion flow. The Doppler shift causes the emission to be blue-shifted (towards shorter wavelength/higher frequency) if the ions are moving towards the point of observation, or red-shifted (towards longer wavelength/lower frequency) if the flow is away from the point of observation. Measurements of the carbon emission line shape are therefore used to extract values for the impurity ion temperature and velocity.

Charge Exchange: H + C^{+6} →

H^{+1} + C^{+5} (n=7, l=6)

Radiative decay: C^{+5} (n=7, l=6) →

C^{+5} (n=6, l=5) + h (photon)

In a typical fusion device the neutral atom density is small. Therefore, the amount of radiated emission that results from charge exchange between impurity ions and neutrals is also small. On MST, the neutral density is enhanced by injection of fast hydrogen atoms via a diagnostic neutral beam (DNB). As a result, the radiated emission is greatly increased, though primarily along the beam injection path (the DNB is located below the deck, and cannot be seen from here; the injection path is from right to left across the plasma). Perpendicular to the beam path, there exist a number of optical ports for viewing the plasma at different radial positions. For a given plasma discharge, a fiber bundle system is placed on one of these ports, and is used to collect emission along its line-of-sight (black tubes on top of the machine contain light collection optics; fibers are placed in the long, curved white tube when not in use). This emission is sent to a spectrometer where it is dispersed over a finite wavelength range — which is centered on the emission line of interest — by a pair of optical gratings. However, because the collected emission is dominated by radiation from along the beam path, the measurements are effectively localized to the intersection volume between the fiber view and the beam. On MST, this intersection volume is small (~ 2 cm^{3}) compared to the plasma volume, allowing spatially resolved measurements of T_{i} and v_{i} to be obtained. Data collected from a number of plasma discharges — for which the location of the fiber bundle system is varied — are used to construct radial profiles of the impurity ion temperature and velocity, providing important information for understanding the physics of plasmas in MST. Typical ion temperatures measured by CHERS on MST are in the range of 100 to 800 eV (2 million to 17 million degrees Fahrenheit), depending on position in the plasma and type of discharge. Likewise, measured equilibrium ion velocities are on the order of 1,000 to 10,000 meters per second.
