= Clarence Max Fowler =

American physicist

Clarence "Max" Fowler
- Born: November 26, 1918; New York City, New York
- Died: February 27, 2006 (aged 87); Los Alamos, New Mexico
- Citizenship: United States
- Known for: Explosively pumped flux compression generator studies about ultra-strong magnetic fields
- Scientific career
- Fields: Theoretical physics
- Institutions: Los Alamos National Laboratory

Clarence Max Fowler (November 26, 1918 – February 27, 2006) was an American physicist who worked at Los Alamos between 1952 and 1996. His main contribution was on explosively pumped flux compression generators.

== Career ==
From 1945 to 1952, Clarence "Max" Fowler did research, successively, at the United States Naval Academy, the University of Michigan, and Kansas State College. He began work for the Los Alamos National Laboratory in 1952, retiring in 1996. During this period Fowler became the highest Western authority on the research and application of explosively pumped flux compression generators. (The research of the Soviet physicist Andrei Sakharov at Sarov was more advanced, but for a long time the whole field of megagauss research was covered by military secrecy). In those years, mega-gauss technologies were being applied for the first time in a series of experimental devices, such as lasers, implosion foils, electromagnetic beam accelerators and the railgun. Fowler also used these generators in order to study the response of several substances to ultra-strong magnetic fields, and among the materials that were investigated were superconductors that operated at the temperature of liquid nitrogen (such as the Yttrium barium copper oxide compound).

== Founding member of the "International Megagauss Conferences" ==
Clarence Fowler was the principal promoter of the first International Megagauss Conference. The first of these was held in Frascati, Italy (1965). The Megagauss conferences were the principal forum where international scientists could present some of their theories and achievements in generating ultra-strong magnetic fields and their applications. Clarence Fowler and his group were the authors of the first paper presented at the first conference in Frascati. After the first, there were nine further conferences (the last was Megagauss-X, held in Berlin in 2004), in each of these meetings Clarence Fowler and his wife Janet were active participants.

== Foundation of NHMFL Consortium ==
Because of the successful research done by his group on the effects of ultra-intense magnetic fields on many materials and their mutual interaction, Florida State and Los Alamos National Laboratory decided to join their efforts to found the National High Magnetic Field Laboratory.

== Publications ==
Clarence Fowler wrote more than 250 scientific papers, always about topics related to ultra-intense magnetic fields.

== Death ==
Clarence "Max" Fowler died on February 27, 2006, at his home, after a brief battle against cancer. He was 87 years old.

== See also ==
- Electromagnetic bomb
- High-altitude nuclear explosion
