= Willard Harrison Bennett =

American physicist (1903–1987)

- Born: June 13, 1903; Findlay, Ohio
- Died: September 28, 1987 (aged 84)
- Education: Carnegie Institute of Technology; University of Michigan
- Known for: Plasma physics
- Scientific career
- Fields: Physics

Willard Harrison Bennett (June 13, 1903 – September 28, 1987) was an American scientist and inventor, born in Findlay, Ohio. Bennett conducted research into plasma physics, astrophysics, geophysics, surface physics, and physical chemistry. The Bennett pinch is named after him.

== Biography ==
Born in Findlay, Ohio, Bennett attended Carnegie Institute of Technology from 1920 to 1922 and Ohio State University; the University of Wisconsin, Sc.M. in physical chemistry, 1926; and the University of Michigan, Ph.D. in physics, 1928. Bennett was elected to a National Research Fellowship in Physics and in 1928 and 1929 studied at the California Institute of Technology. In 1930 he joined the Physics faculty at Ohio State. During the World War II era, he served as an officer in the United States Army and developed aircraft equipment. Following military service, Bennett worked at the National Bureau of Standards, the University of Arkansas, and the United States Naval Research Laboratory. In 1961, he was appointed Burlington Professor of Physics at North Carolina State University (emeritus in 1976). Bennett held 67 patents.

Bennett made scientific history in the 1930s pioneering studies in plasma physics, the study of gases ionized by high-voltage electricity. Bennett invented radio frequency mass spectrometry in (1955). Bennett's radio-frequency mass spectrometer measured the masses of atoms. It was the first such experiment in space. He also researched gases ionized by high-voltage electricity. This research was used in later thermonuclear fusion research.

== Invention impact ==
These studies and later research have been used throughout the world in controlled thermonuclear fusion research. In the 1950s, Bennett's experimental tube called the Stormertron predicted and modeled the Van Allen radiation belts surrounding the Earth six years before they were discovered by satellite. It also reproduced intricate impact patterns found on the Earth's surface which explained many features of the polar aurora. Sputnik 3 carried the first radio frequency mass spectrometer into space.
