= Reversed field pinch =

Magnetic field plasma confinement device

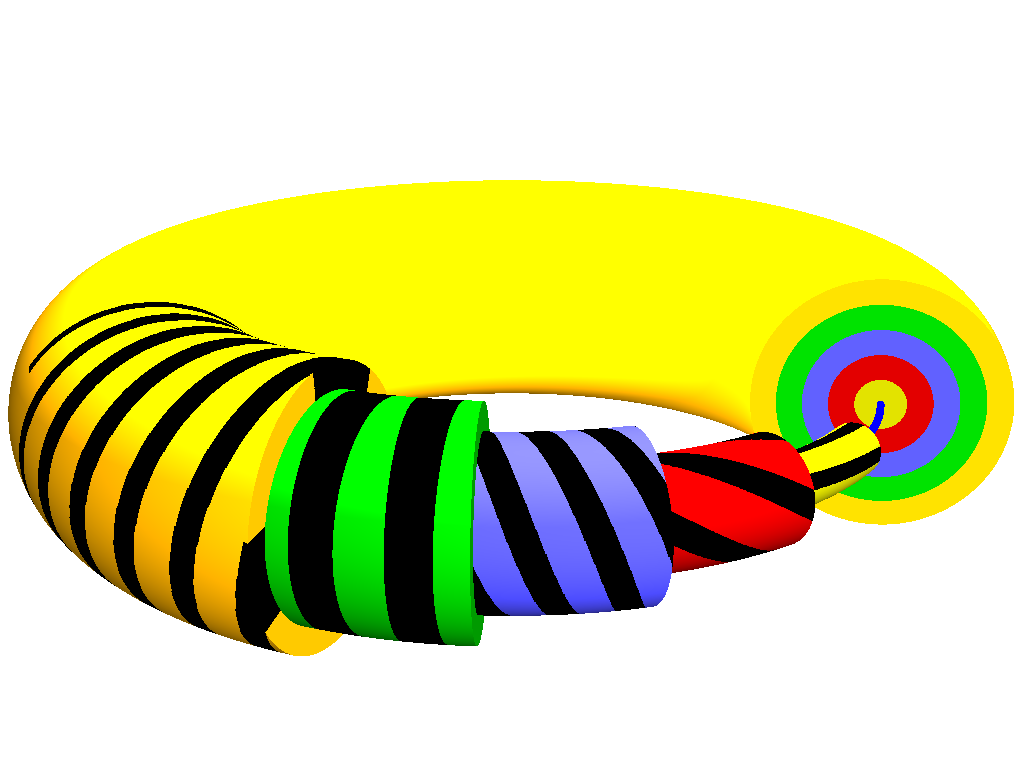
The q profile in a reversed field pinch

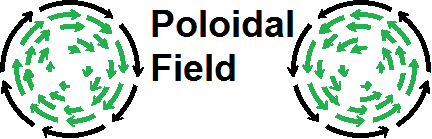
The poloidal field in a reversed field pinch

A reversed-field pinch (RFP) is a device used to produce and contain near-thermonuclear plasmas. It is a toroidal pinch that uses a unique magnetic field configuration as a scheme to magnetically confine a plasma, primarily to study magnetic confinement fusion. Its magnetic geometry is somewhat different from that of a tokamak. As one moves out radially, the portion of the magnetic field pointing toroidally reverses its direction, giving rise to the term reversed field. This configuration can be sustained with comparatively lower fields than that of a tokamak of similar power density. One of the disadvantages of this configuration is that it tends to be more susceptible to non-linear effects and turbulence. This makes it a useful system for studying non-ideal (resistive) magnetohydrodynamics. RFPs are also used in studying astrophysical plasmas, which share many common features.

The largest Reversed Field Pinch device presently in operation is the RFX (R/a = 2/0.46) in Padua, Italy. Others include the MST (R/a = 1.5/0.5) in the United States, EXTRAP T2R (R/a = 1.24/0.18) in Sweden, RELAX (R/a = 0.51/0.25) in Japan, and KTX (R/a = 1.4/0.4) in China.

== Characteristics ==
Unlike the Tokamak, which has a much larger magnetic field in the toroidal direction than the poloidal direction, an RFP has a comparable field strength in both directions (though the sign of the toroidal field reverses). Moreover, a typical RFP has a field strength approximately one half to one tenth that of a comparable Tokamak. The RFP also relies on driving current in the plasma to reinforce the field from the magnets through the dynamo effect.

=== Magnetic topology ===
The Internal Field in an RFP

The reversed-field pinch works towards a state of minimum energy.

The magnetic field lines coil loosely around a center torus. They coil outwards. Near the plasma edge, the toroidal magnetic field reverses and the field lines coil in the reverse direction.

Internal fields are bigger than the fields at the magnets.

== RFP in Fusion Research: comparison with other confinement configurations ==
The RFP has many features that make it a promising configuration for a potential fusion reactor.

=== Advantages ===
1. Superconducting Magnets:
  - RFPs may not need superconducting magnets, providing a significant advantage over tokamaks.
  - Superconducting magnets are delicate, expensive, and must be shielded from the neutron-rich fusion environment.
2. Shell as a Magnetic Coil:
  - Some RFP experiments, like the Madison Symmetric Torus, use a close-fitting shell as a magnetic coil.
  - Driving current through the shell itself is attractive for reactor design.
  - A solid copper shell could be robust against high-energy neutrons compared to superconducting magnets.
3. Surface Instabilities:
  - RFPs are susceptible to surface instabilities, necessitating a close-fitting shell.
4. Beta Limit:
  - There is no established beta limit for RFPs.
5. Ignition Possibility:
  - There's a possibility that a reversed field pinch could achieve ignition solely with ohmic power.
  - This involves driving current through the plasma and generating heat from electrical resistance rather than through electron cyclotron resonance, potentially simplifying reactor design compared to tokamaks.
  - However, it may not be operated in a steady state.

=== Disadvantages ===
Several key areas present challenges in the development of RFP reactors. Researchers are actively working on solutions for these issues:

- Current Drive Mechanisms: Current RFP devices rely on a method known as ohmic current drive, which has limitations. Researchers are exploring alternative current drive techniques to improve efficiency and control.
- Tearing Mode Mitigation: RFP plasmas are susceptible to tearing modes, which can negatively impact performance. Development of active control methods for these modes is crucial for achieving stable plasma confinement.
- Plasma Confinement Optimization: Current RFP devices achieve lower plasma confinement times compared to tokamaks. Research is ongoing to optimize plasma confinement in RFPs, including investigating the impact of device size through projects like the Madison Symmetric Torus (MST).
- Shell Design Considerations: The RFP design necessitates a conductive shell positioned close to the plasma, which presents engineering challenges for reactor design. Research is focused on optimizing the shell configuration to balance performance and practicality.
- Maintenance Strategies for Plasma Control Systems: Certain RFP designs utilize complex coil systems for plasma control. The proximity of these coils to the high-temperature plasma environment necessitates the development of robust maintenance strategies to ensure their long-term functionality.

== Plasma Physics Research ==
The Reversed Field Pinch is also interesting from a physics standpoint. RFP dynamics are highly turbulent. RFPs also exhibit a strong plasma dynamo, similar to many astrophysical bodies. Basic plasma science is another important aspect of Reversed Field Pinch research.

== See also ==
- Dominique Franck Escande
