= Explosive-driven ferroelectric generator =

An explosive-driven ferroelectric generator (EDFEG, explosively pumped ferroelectric generator, EPFEG, or FEG) is a compact pulsed power generator, a device used for generation of short high-voltage high-current pulse. The energies available are fairly low, in the range of single joules, the voltages range in tens of kilovolts to over 100 kV, and the powers range in hundreds of kilowatts to megawatts. They are suitable for delivering high voltage pulses to high-impedance loads and can directly drive radiating circuits.

ECFEGs operate by releasing the electrical charge stored in the poled crystal structure of a suitable ferroelectric material, e.g. PZT, by an intense mechanical shock. They are a kind of phase transition generators.

The structure of an EDFEG is generally a block of a suitable high explosive, accelerating a metal plate into a target made of ferroelectric material.

FEGs find multiple uses due to their compact character; charging banks of capacitors, initiation of slapper detonator arrays in nuclear weapons and other devices, driving nuclear fusion reactions, powering pulsed neutron generators, seed power sources for stronger pulse generators (e.g. EPFCGs), electromagnetic pulse generators, electromagnetic weapons, vector inversion generators, etc.

A 2.4 megawatt HERF generator (an EDFEG with a pulse forming network directly driving a dipole antenna) with peak output frequency at 21.4 MHz was demonstrated.

== See also ==
- Explosively pumped flux compression generator
- Explosive-driven ferromagnetic generator
