= L. R. Ingersoll Physics Museum =

Science museum at the University of Wisconsin-Madison

Coordinates: 43.0738°N 89.4055°W

The L.R. Ingersoll Physics Museum is located on the second floor of Chamberlin Hall on the University of Wisconsin-Madison campus. It is one of several museums on the University of Wisconsin-Madison campus that focus on hands-on exhibits and public outreach. The museum runs on donations and charges no admission.

== History ==
The museum was established in 1918 by Professor Snow and the museum's namesake, Leonard Rose Ingersoll (1880-1958), who taught at the University of Wisconsin-Madison. L.R. Ingersoll began advocating for the museum in 1917 and it became the first museum in the United States to focus solely on physics. Ingersoll wanted to create a museum that was accessible to young audiences. Since then, exhibits have continued to be designed by University of Wisconsin-Madison faculty and added to the museum.

== Exhibits ==
The L.R. Ingersoll Physics Museum displays more than 70 interactive exhibits that cross several categories of Physics concepts.

A few exhibits include:

=== Mechanics ===
- Gravity Pit - demonstrates the concept of a gravity well with a hyperbolic funnel wishing well.
- Newton's Cradle
- Pulleys
- Spinning Platform
- Gyroscope
- Foucault Pendulum
- Torsion Pendulum
- Unequal Arm Balance
- Coupled Pendulums

=== Electricity and Magnetism ===
- AC - DC Generators
- Series and parallel circuits puzzle
- Circle of Magnetism
- Dynamo 1 and 2
- Induced Currents - Eddy Currents
- Lenz's Law
- The Magnetic Field - Lines of Force
- The Rotating Copper Disk
- Rotating Pepsi Can
- Helmholtz Coils
- Electrons Beam

=== Light and Optics ===
- Additive Color Mixing
- Subtractive Color Mixing
- Color of an Object
- Light and Atomic Spectra
- Mystery Window
- The Radiometer
- Polarized Light
- Light Waves
- Telescope
- Convex, Plane & Concave Mirrors
- As Others See You
- Your Profiles
- Infinite Reflections
- Real Image

=== Wave and Sound ===
- Transverse Waves
- Sound Pipes

=== Modern Physics ===
- Plasma Tube
- Cosmic Rays
- Spirograph
- Probability Board

=== Computer Demonstrations ===
- Chaos Demonstration
- Lissajous Curve Demonstration
- Your Voice
