= FlyEgypt =

Egyptian low-cost and charter airline

flyEgypt
IATA	ICAO	Call sign
FT	FEG	SKY EGYPT
- Founded: 2014
- Commenced operations: February 12, 2015
- Ceased operations: October 21, 2024
- Operating bases: Alexandria; Cairo
- Fleet size: 2
- Destinations: 9 (scheduled)
- Headquarters: Cairo, Egypt
- Key people: Ahmed el Helw, CEO
- Employees: 600
- Website: flyegypt.com

flyEgypt is an Egyptian airline headquartered in Cairo.

== History ==
The airline was founded in 2014 as a single class charter operator and started operations on 12 February 2015 with a flight between Cairo and Jeddah. On 11 July 2015 it started a weekly seasonal service between Zürich and Marsa Alam. On 21 October 2024, it was reported that FlyEgypt had ceased flight operations due to financial difficulties.

== Destinations ==
As of February 2022, FlyEgypt served the following scheduled destinations (excluding seasonal charter operations):

Country	City	Airport	Notes	Refs
Armenia	Yerevan	Zvartnots Airport	Seasonal	
Egypt	Alexandria	Borg El Arab Airport	Base	
Egypt	Cairo	Cairo International Airport	Base	
Egypt	Sharm El Sheikh	Sharm El Sheikh International Airport	Seasonal	
Saudi Arabia	Jeddah	King Abdulaziz International Airport		
Saudi Arabia	Medina	Prince Mohammad bin Abdulaziz International Airport		
Saudi Arabia	Riyadh	King Khalid International Airport		
Saudi Arabia	Yanbu	Prince Abdul Mohsin bin Abdulaziz International Airport		
United Arab Emirates	Sharjah	Sharjah International Airport		
Uzbekistan	Tashkent	Tashkent International Airport		

== Fleet ==
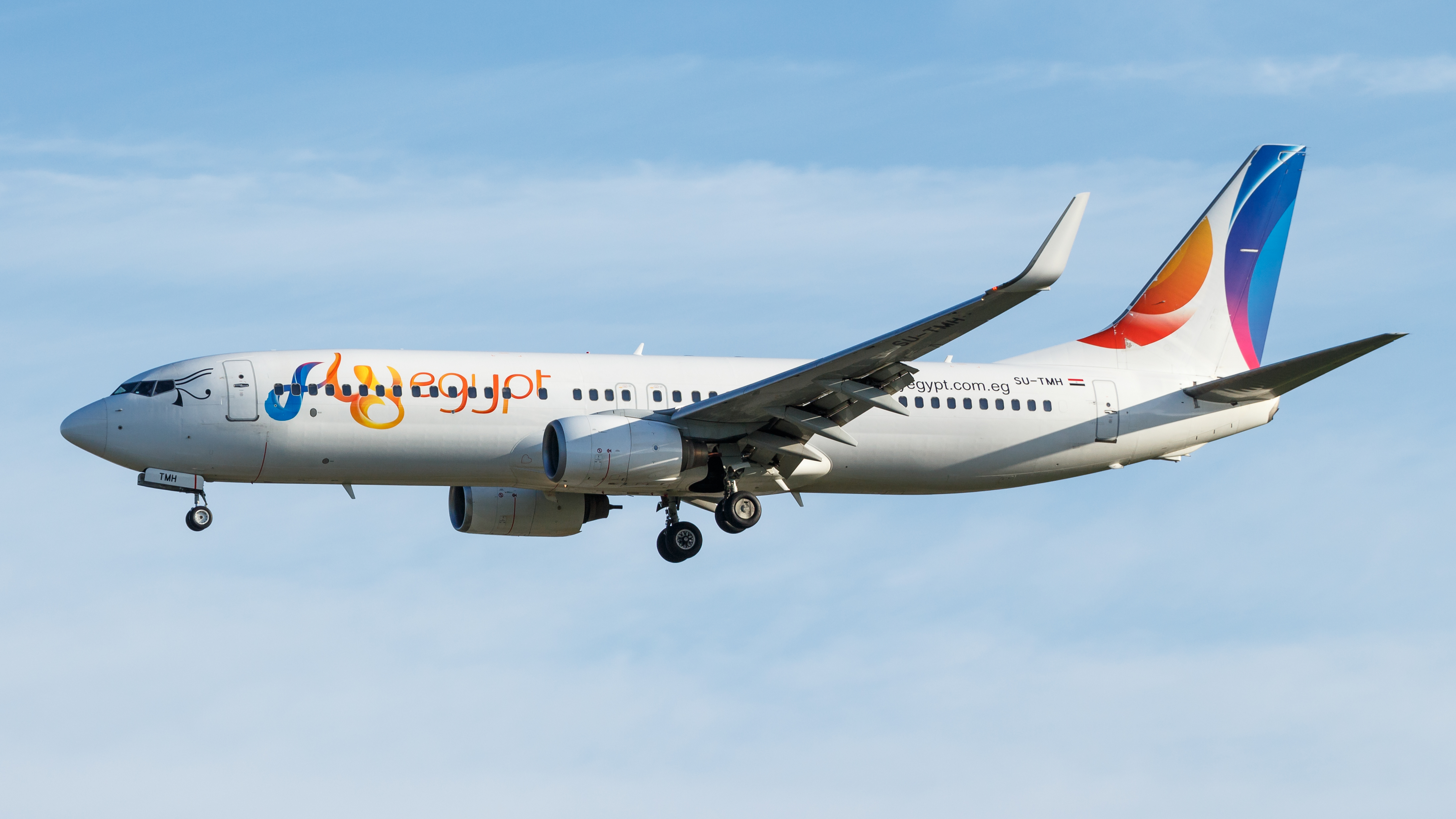
FlyEgypt Boeing 737-800

As of June 2023, the FlyEgypt fleet consisted of the following aircraft:

FlyEgypt fleet
Aircraft	In service	Orders	Passengers	Notes
Boeing 737-800	2	—	189	
Total	2	—		
