= Per Carlqvist =

Swedish physicist

Per Carlqvist (born July 25, 1938, in Stockholm, Sweden) is a Swedish plasma physicist with an interest in astrophysical applications. In 1963, he received the degree of civilingenjör from the Royal Institute of Technology, Stockholm; in 1970, the Tekn. lic.; and in 1980 the Tekn. D.

He is currently affiliated with the Royal Institute of Technology, Stockholm, at the School of Electrical Engineering in the department of Space & Plasma Physics.

He is the author of several papers on astrophysical plasmas, from the formation of stars, double layers, the Bennett Pinch, to interstellar helical filaments.

== The Carlqvist Relation ==
Carlqvist lends his name to the "Carlqvist Relation", a formula used in plasma physics to describe how an electrically conducting plasma filament is compressed by magnetic forces to form a "plasma pinch". Carlqvist noted that by using his relation, and a derivative, it is possible to describe the Bennett pinch, the Jeans criterion (for gravitational instability, in one and two dimensions), force-free magnetic fields, gravitationally balanced magnetic pressures, and continuous transitions between these states.
