= Electromagnetic forming =

Metal forming process

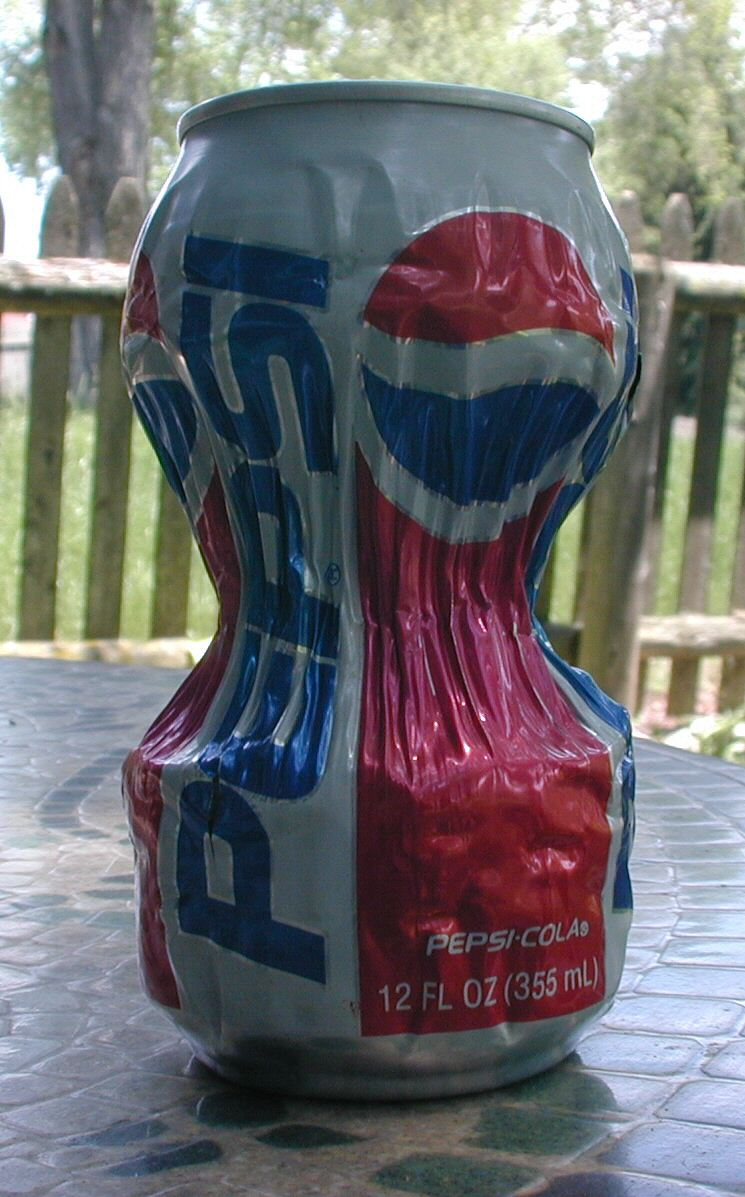
A pinched aluminium can, produced from a pulsed magnetic field created by rapidly discharging 2 kilojoules from a high-voltage capacitor bank into a 3-turn coil of heavy gauge wire.

Electromagnetic forming (EM forming or magneforming) is a type of high-velocity, cold forming process for electrically conductive metals, most commonly copper and aluminium. The workpiece is reshaped by high-intensity pulsed magnetic fields that induce a current in the workpiece and a corresponding repulsive magnetic field, rapidly repelling portions of the workpiece. The workpiece can be reshaped without any contact from a tool, although in some instances the piece may be pressed against a die or former. The technique is sometimes called high-velocity forming or electromagnetic pulse technology.

== Explanation ==
A special coil is placed near the metallic workpiece, replacing the pusher in traditional forming. When the system releases its intense magnetic pulse, the coil generates a magnetic field which in turn accelerates the workpiece to hyper speed and onto the die. The magnetic pulse and the extreme deformation speed transforms the metal into a visco-plastic state – increasing formability without affecting the native strength of the material. See the magnetic pulse forming illustration for a visualization.

A rapidly changing magnetic field induces a circulating electric current within a nearby conductor through electromagnetic induction. The induced current creates a corresponding magnetic field around the conductor (see Pinch (plasma physics)). Because of Lenz's Law, the magnetic fields created within the conductor and work coil strongly repel each other.

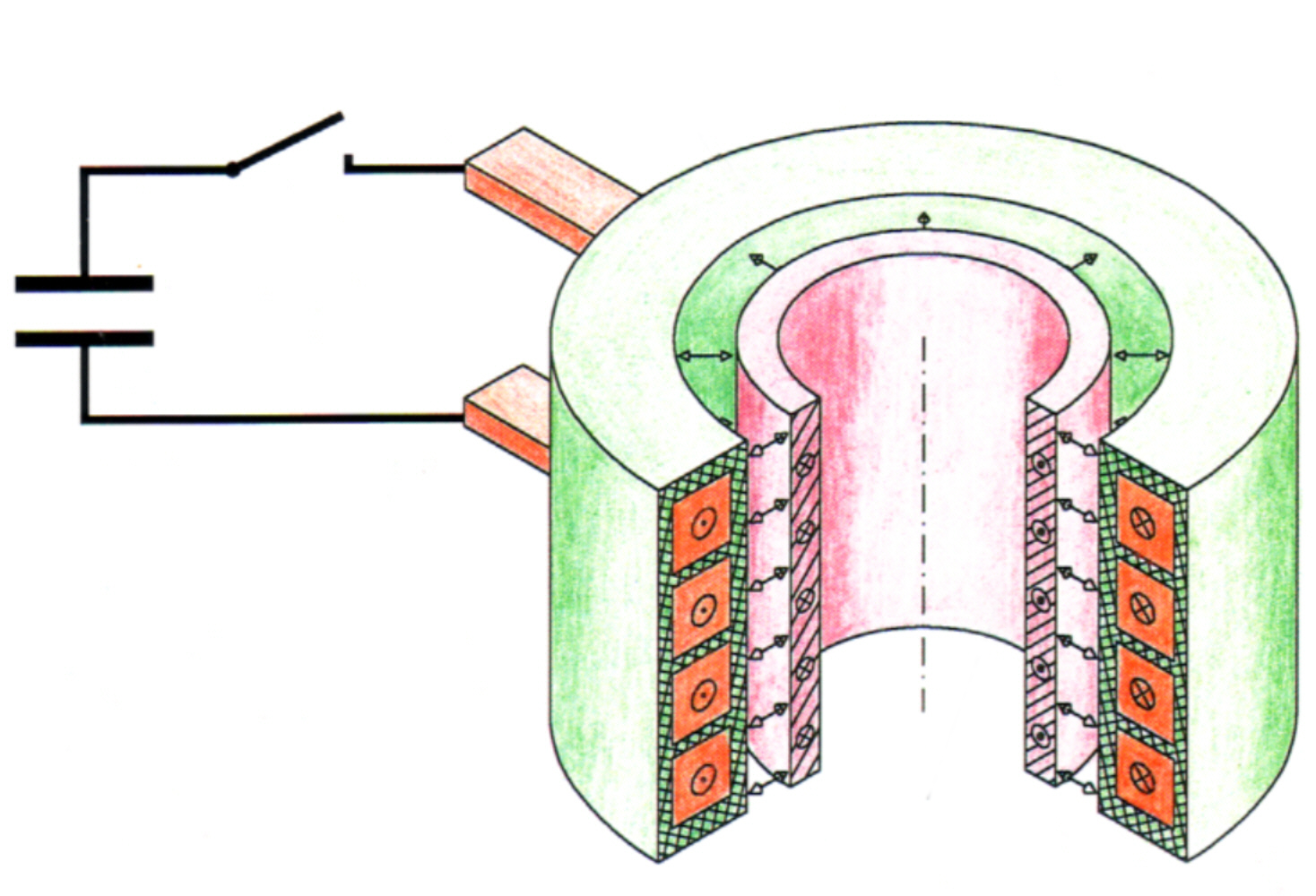
When the switch is closed, electrical energy stored in the capacitor bank (left) is discharged through the forming coil (orange) producing a rapidly changing magnetic field which induces a current to flow in the metallic workpiece (pink). The current flowing the workpiece produces a corresponding opposite magnetic field which rapidly repels the workpiece from the forming coil, reshaping the workpiece — in this case, compressing the diameter of the cylindrical tube. The reciprocal forces acting against the forming coil are resisted by the 'supportive coil casing (green).

In practice the metal workpiece to be fabricated is placed in proximity to a heavily constructed coil of wire (called the work coil). A huge pulse of current is forced through the work coil by rapidly discharging a high-voltage capacitor bank using an ignitron or a spark gap as a switch. This creates a rapidly oscillating, ultra strong electromagnetic field around the work coil.

The high work coil current (typically tens or hundreds of thousands of amperes) creates ultra strong magnetic forces that easily overcome the yield strength of the metal work piece, causing permanent deformation. The metal forming process occurs extremely quickly (typically tens of microseconds) and, because of the large forces, portions of the workpiece undergo high acceleration reaching velocities of up to 300 m/s.

== Applications ==
The forming process is most often used to shrink or expand cylindrical tubing, but it can also form sheet metal by repelling the work piece onto a shaped die at a high velocity. High-quality joints can be formed, either by electromagnetic pulse crimping with a mechanical interlock or by electromagnetic pulse welding with a true metallurgical weld. Since the forming operation involves high acceleration and deceleration, mass of the work piece plays a critical role during the forming process. The process works best with good electrical conductors such as copper or aluminum, but it can be adapted to work with poorer conductors such as steel.

== Comparison with mechanical forming ==
Electromagnetic forming has a number of advantages and disadvantages compared to conventional mechanical forming techniques.

Some of the advantages are;

- Improved formability (the amount of stretch available without tearing)
- Wrinkling can be greatly suppressed
- Forming can be combined with joining and assembling with dissimilar components including glass, plastic, composites and other metals.
- Close tolerances are possible as springback can be significantly reduced.
- Single-sided dies are sufficient, which can reduce tooling costs
- Lubricants are reduced or are unnecessary, so forming can be used in clean-room conditions
- Mechanical contact with the workpiece is not required; this avoids surface contamination and tooling marks. As a result, a surface finish can be applied to the workpiece before forming.

The principle disadvantages are;

- Non-conductive materials cannot be formed directly, but can be formed using a conductive drive plate
- The high voltages and currents involved require careful safety considerations
