= Vector inversion generator =

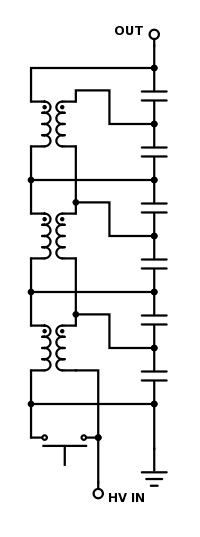
A 3-stage discrete component vector inversion generator.

A vector inversion generator (VIG) is an electric pulse compression and voltage multiplication device, allowing shaping a slower, lower voltage pulse to a narrower, higher-voltage one. VIGs are used in military technology, e.g. some directed-energy weapons, as a secondary stage of another pulsed power source, commonly an explosive-driven ferroelectric generator.

== Construction ==
Discrete component VIGs (pictured) consist of a stack of well-coupled common mode chokes interconnected with a stack of capacitors. The inductors present a high inductance to currents that are in-phase in the two windings, and a far lower inductance when the winding currents are flowing in opposite directions. The capacitors are charged with alternating polarity and when the switch (usually a triggered or free running spark gap in practice) is closed the voltage across every second capacitor rapidly inverts as a half cycle of oscillation at a frequency set by the capacitance resonating with the differential mode inductance of the chokes. At the same time the other capacitors discharge very slowly due to not having a differential current flowing to cancel the reactance. So after a half period, all the capacitors are in series and the voltages add. This arrangement has a conceptual equivalence to the spiral VIG, with the alternating capacitors being equivalent to the capacitance between the windings and the common mode chokes being equivalent to the inductance of a winding. Discrete components allow large lumped capacitors to be used thus storing much more energy, but have difficulty replicating the high voltage multiplication ratios and extremely short rise times of spiral transmission line types.

A spiral VIG consists of four alternating conductor-insulator-conductor-insulator sheets, wound into a cylinder, forming a capacitor also acting as a single-ended transmission line, connected to a spark gap switch. The capacitor is charged from a power source, e.g. an EDFEG, then the spark gap fires after its breakdown voltage is reached. The electromagnetic wave created by the electric spark discharge travels along the transmission line, converting electrostatic field to electromagnetic field, then after reflecting from the open end converts back to electrostatic field. A pulse of output amplitude 2nU (where n is the number of turns of the capacitor and U is the initial voltage it was charged to) and a rise time equal to twice the electrical length of the transmission line. The device acts as a distributed pulse forming network.

Ferrites can be attached to the VIG construction to modify its characteristics, typically lowering the resonant frequency and increasing the efficiency.

== Applications ==
VIGs are advantageous due to their simplicity and the very short pulse rise times in range of nanoseconds. Some VIGs can be configured as part of a tuned circuit, acting as oscillators with practical upper limit of about 700 MHz, generating energy that can be radiated from a suitable antenna, allowing construction of very simple explosion-generated electromagnetic pulse generators.

The use of VIGs includes directed-energy weapons, x-ray pulse power supplies, plasma generators, etc.
