= Ekaterina Feoktistova =

Soviet chemist, engineer, and physicist

Ekaterina Alekseevna Feoktistova (also Alekseyevna) (Russian:Екатерина Алексеевна Феоктистова, 18 March 1915 – 5 January 1987) was a Ukrainian Soviet chemist, engineer, physicist and explosives expert. She worked on the Soviet atomic bomb project from 1947 until her retirement, leading a laboratory from 1952.

== Life and career ==
Aged 18, she began working as a chemist at the Krasnaya Nity textile factory, Kharkiv, Ukraine. She studied at Kharkov State University in 1934, and in 1935 at the Kiev Industrial Institute. In 1937, she was transferred to a special department at the Leningrad Chemical and Technological Institute. She graduated with a red diploma as an engineer-technologist. She enrolled in graduate school but remained at the institute as a research assistant. During these years, she flew planes and made parachute jumps.

When Nazi Germany invaded the Soviet Union in 1941, Feoktistov was evacuated to Sverdlovsk, where she worked as a process engineer at the Scientific Mining Society in the Urals. In 1942, she worked at Factory 46 of the Ministry of Armaments as a senior engineer. The following year, she was transferred to the Ministry's cartridge design bureau in Kuntsevo, Moscow Oblast. She returned to the Leningrad Institute in 1945 as a research officer, then senior research officer while continuing to study in graduate school. Between 1946-1947 she was a freelance instructor of the Frunzensky District Committee of the communist party. She gained her Ph.D. in 1947. In December that year, she was sent to work at the secret nuclear research facility KB-11 ('Design Bureau-11', which was also known as Arzamas-16 and colloquially the 'Installation', now the All-Russian Scientific Research Institute of Experimental Physics (VNIIEF)).

At KB-11, she worked in laboratory No.2 under the directorship of leading explosives researcher Alexandr Belyaev. Her research was using TNT/RDX, used in the first Soviet nuclear bombs. She won the first of her state prizes in 1950 for this work. In 1951 and 1952, she led a group experimenting with pulsed magnetic fields and currents produced by explosives, following up on the ideas of leading nuclear bomb designer Andrei Sakharov.

Feoktistov became a laboratory chief in 1952. In June 1955, the laboratory was officially transferred to a new nuclear research and development centre, NII-1011 (VNIITF) in Chelyabinsk-70 (a city now known as Snezhinsk). Until 1958, however, it remained at KB-11 where Feoktistov studied how explosives were affected by irradiation from a nuclear reactor. She was one of the last to move to NII-1011 (her fellow student at the Kiev Industrial Institute, George Lominsky, was to become its head). In 1959 and 1961, she was elected to the Chelyabinsk-70 communist party committee and became a deputy of the Regional Council of Workers, and later a member of the central committee of the trade union. In the early 1960s, her research was initially purely on explosives but then wholly given over to improving on the RDX-based charge used as a stage nuclear weapons, and this was achieved using HMX (or octogen) with a significant increase in the energy release, first tested with a small nuclear charge on 21 October 1968.

In 1969, she gained a doctor of science Ph.D, according to the Soviet system. From 1979, although retired, she carried on as a senior researcher at NII-1011. She would have received a final USSR State Prize in 1983 but withdrew her candidacy. During her career she was a member of the commission for explosive materials of the Ministry of Medium Machine Building (the state ministry for producing nuclear weapons) and a member of the council awarding Ph.Ds, having trained many student researchers.

She died in Snezhinsk in 1987.

== Awards ==
- 1950: USSR Council of Ministers prize.
- 1952: Order of the Red Banner of Labour.
- 1956: Order of Lenin.
- 1951 & 1953: Stalin Prize (2nd and 3rd degree respectively).
- 1970: USSR State Prize.
- 1975: Freeman of Snezhinsk.
