= Wien filter =

Velocity filter for charged particles

A Wien filter velocity selector

A Wien filter also known as a velocity selector is a device consisting of perpendicular electric and magnetic fields that can be used as a velocity filter for charged particles, for example in electron microscopes and spectrometers. It is used in accelerator mass spectrometry to select particles based on their speed. The device is composed of orthogonal electric and magnetic fields, such that particles with the correct speed will be unaffected while other particles will be deflected. It is named for Wilhelm Wien who developed it in 1898 for the study of anode rays. It can be configured as a charged particle energy analyzer, monochromator, or mass spectrometer.

== Theory ==
Any charged particle in an electric field will feel a force proportional to the charge and field strength such that $\vec{F} = q \vec{E}$, where F is force, q is charge, and E is electric field strength. Similarly, any particle moving in a magnetic field will feel a force proportional to the velocity and charge of the particle. The force felt by any particle is then equal to $\vec{F} = q \vec{v} \times \vec{B}$, where F is force, q is the charge on the particle, v is the velocity of the particle, B is the strength of the magnetic field, and $\times$ is the cross product. In the case of a velocity selector, the magnetic field is always at 90 degrees to the velocity and the force is simplified to $F = qvB$ in the direction described by the cross product.

Setting the two forces to equal magnitude in opposite directions it can be shown that $\frac{E}{B} = v$. Which means that any combination of electric ($\vec{E}$) and magnetic ($\vec{B}$) fields will allow charged particles with only velocity $\vec{v}$ through.

== See also ==
- Neutron-velocity selector
