= Neutron =

Subatomic particle with no charge

- The quark content of a neutron. The color assignment of individual quarks is arbitrary, but all three colors must be present. Forces between quarks are mediated by gluons.
- Classification: Baryon
- Composition: 1 up quark, 2 down quarks
- Statistics: Fermionic
- Family: Hadron
- Interactions: Gravity, weak, strong, electromagnetic
- Symbol: n, n^{0}, N^{0}
- Antiparticle: Antineutron
- Theorized: Ernest Rutherford (1920)
- Discovered: James Chadwick (1932)
- Mass: 1.67492750056(85)×10^{−27} kg 939.56542194(48) MeV/c^{2} 1.00866491606(40) Da
- Mean lifetime: 878.4(5) s (free)
- Electric charge: 0 e (−2±8)×10^{−22} e (experimental limits)
- Electric dipole moment: < 1.8×10^{−26} e⋅cm (experimental upper limit)
- Electric polarizability: 1.16(15)×10^{−3} fm^{3}
- Magnetic moment: −0.96623650(23)×10^{−26} J·T^{−1} −1.04187563(25)×10^{−3} μ_{B} −1.91304273(45) μ_{N}
- Magnetic polarizability: 3.7(20)×10^{−4} fm^{3}
- Spin: 1/2 ħ
- Isospin: −1/2
- Parity: +1
- Condensed: I(J^{P}) = 1/2(1/2^{+})

A neutron is a subatomic particle, symbol n or n^{0}, that has no electric charge, and a mass slightly greater than that of a proton. The neutron was discovered by James Chadwick in 1932, leading to the discovery of nuclear fission in 1938, the first self-sustaining nuclear reactor (Chicago Pile-1, 1942), and the first nuclear weapon (Trinity, 1945).

Neutrons are found, together with a similar number of protons, in the nuclei of atoms. Atoms of a chemical element that differ only in neutron number are called isotopes. Free neutrons are produced copiously in nuclear fission and fusion. They are a primary contributor to the nucleosynthesis of chemical elements within stars through fission, fusion, and neutron capture processes. Neutron stars, formed from massive collapsing stars, consist of neutrons at the density of atomic nuclei but a total mass more than the Sun.

Neutron properties and interactions are described by nuclear physics. Neutrons are not elementary particles; each is composed of three quarks. A free neutron spontaneously decays to a proton, an electron, and an antineutrino, with a mean lifetime of about 15 minutes.

The neutron is essential to the production of nuclear power. Dedicated neutron sources like neutron generators, research reactors and spallation sources produce free neutrons for use in irradiation and in neutron scattering experiments. Free neutrons do not directly ionize atoms, but they do indirectly cause ionizing radiation, so they can be a biological hazard, depending on dose. A small natural "neutron background" flux of free neutrons exists on Earth, caused by cosmic rays, and by the natural radioactivity of spontaneously fissionable elements in the Earth's crust.

== Discovery ==
The story of the discovery of the neutron and its properties is central to the extraordinary developments in atomic physics that occurred in the first half of the 20th century, leading ultimately to the atomic bomb in 1945. The name derives from the Latin root for neutralis (neuter) and the Greek suffix -on (a suffix used in the names of subatomic particles, e.g. electron and proton) and references to the word neutron can be found in the literature as early as 1899 in connection with discussion on the nature of the atom.

In the 1911 Rutherford model, the atom consisted of a small positively charged massive nucleus surrounded by a much larger cloud of negatively charged electrons. In 1920, Ernest Rutherford suggested that the nucleus consisted of positive protons and neutrally charged particles, suggested to be a proton and an electron bound in some way. Electrons were assumed to reside within the nucleus because it was known that beta radiation consisted of electrons emitted from the nucleus. About the time Rutherford suggested the neutral proton-electron composite, several other publications appeared making similar suggestions, and in 1921 the American chemist W. D. Harkins first named the hypothetical particle a "neutron".

Throughout the 1920s, physicists assumed that the atomic nucleus was composed of protons and "nuclear electrons". Beginning in 1928, it became clear that this model was inconsistent with the then-new quantum theory. Confined to a volume the size of a nucleus, an electron consistent with the Heisenberg uncertainty relation of quantum mechanics would have an energy exceeding the binding energy of the nucleus. The energy was so large that according to the Klein paradox, discovered by Oskar Klein in 1928, an electron would escape the confinement of a nucleus. Furthermore, the observed properties of atoms and molecules were inconsistent with the nuclear spin expected from the proton–electron hypothesis. Protons and electrons both carry an intrinsic spin of 1/2ħ, and the isotopes of the same species were found to have either integer or fractional spin. By the hypothesis, isotopes would be composed of the same number of protons, but differing numbers of neutral bound proton+electron "particles". This physical picture was a contradiction, since there is no way to arrange the spins of an electron and a proton in a bound state to get a fractional spin.

In 1931, Walther Bothe and Herbert Becker found that if alpha particle radiation from polonium fell on beryllium, boron, or lithium, an unusually penetrating radiation was produced. The radiation was not influenced by an electric field, so Bothe and Becker assumed it was gamma radiation. The following year Irène Joliot-Curie and Frédéric Joliot-Curie in Paris showed that if this "gamma" radiation fell on paraffin, or any other hydrogen-containing compound, it ejected protons of very high energy. Neither Rutherford nor James Chadwick at the Cavendish Laboratory in Cambridge were convinced by the gamma ray interpretation. Chadwick quickly performed a series of experiments that showed that the new radiation consisted of uncharged particles with about the same mass as the proton. These properties matched Rutherford's hypothesized neutron. Chadwick won the 1935 Nobel Prize in Physics for this discovery.

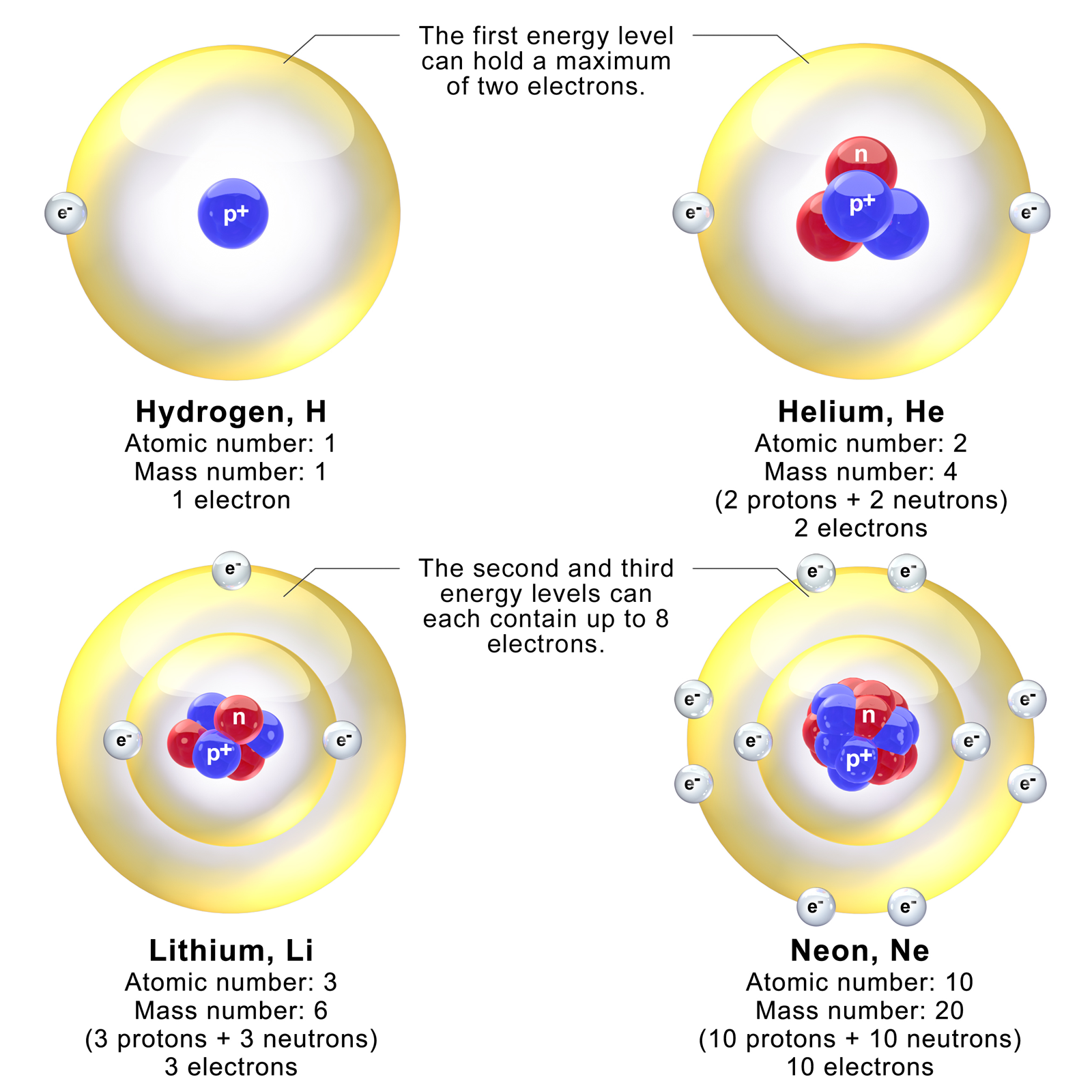
Models depicting the nucleus and electron energy levels in hydrogen, helium, lithium, and neon atoms. In reality, the diameter of the nucleus is about 100,000 times smaller than the diameter of the atom.

Models for an atomic nucleus consisting of protons and neutrons were quickly developed by Werner Heisenberg and others. The proton–neutron model explained the puzzle of nuclear spins. The origins of beta radiation were explained by Enrico Fermi in 1934 by the process of beta decay, in which the neutron decays to a proton by creating an electron and a then-undiscovered neutrino. In 1935, Chadwick and his doctoral student Maurice Goldhaber reported the first accurate measurement of the mass of the neutron.

By 1934, Fermi had bombarded heavier elements with neutrons to induce radioactivity in elements of high atomic number. In 1938, Fermi received the Nobel Prize in Physics "for his demonstrations of the existence of new radioactive elements produced by neutron irradiation, and for his related discovery of nuclear reactions brought about by slow neutrons". In December 1938 Otto Hahn, Lise Meitner, and Fritz Strassmann discovered nuclear fission, or the fractionation of uranium nuclei into lighter elements, induced by neutron bombardment. In 1945 Hahn received the 1944 Nobel Prize in Chemistry "for his discovery of the fission of heavy atomic nuclei".

The discovery of nuclear fission would lead to the development of nuclear power and the atomic bomb by the end of World War II. It was quickly realized that, if a fission event produced neutrons, each of these neutrons might cause further fission events, in a cascade known as a nuclear chain reaction. These events and findings led Fermi to construct the Chicago Pile-1 at the University of Chicago in 1942, the first self-sustaining nuclear reactor. Just three years later the Manhattan Project was able to test the first atomic bomb, the Trinity nuclear test in July 1945.

== Occurrence ==
=== Atomic nucleus ===
An atomic nucleus is formed by a number of protons, Z (the atomic number), and a number of neutrons, N (the neutron number), bound together by the nuclear force. Protons and neutrons each have a mass of approximately one dalton. The atomic number determines the chemical properties of the atom, and the neutron number determines the isotope or nuclide. The terms isotope and nuclide are often used synonymously, but they refer to chemical and nuclear properties, respectively. Isotopes are nuclides with the same atomic number, but different neutron number. Nuclides with the same neutron number, but different atomic number, are called isotones. The atomic mass number, A, is equal to the sum of atomic and neutron numbers. Nuclides with the same atomic mass number, but different atomic and neutron numbers, are called isobars. The mass of a nucleus is always slightly less than the sum of its proton and neutron masses: the difference in mass represents the mass equivalent to nuclear binding energy, the energy which would need to be added to take the nucleus apart.

The nucleus of the most common isotope of the hydrogen atom (with the chemical symbol ^{1}H) is a lone proton. The nuclei of the heavy hydrogen isotopes deuterium (D or ^{2}H) and tritium (T or ^{3}H) contain one proton bound to one and two neutrons, respectively. All other types of atomic nuclei are composed of two or more protons and various numbers of neutrons. The most common nuclide of the common chemical element lead, ^{208}Pb, has 82 protons and 126 neutrons, for example. The table of nuclides comprises all the known nuclides. Even though it is not a chemical element, the neutron is included in this table.

Nuclear fission caused by absorption of a neutron by uranium-235. The heavy nuclide fragments into lighter components and additional neutrons.

Protons and neutrons behave almost identically under the influence of the nuclear force within the nucleus. They are therefore both referred to collectively as nucleons. The concept of isospin, in which the proton and neutron are viewed as two quantum states of the same particle, is used to model the interactions of nucleons by the nuclear or weak forces.

Neutrons are a necessary constituent of any atomic nucleus that contains more than one proton. As a result of their positive charges, interacting protons have a mutual electromagnetic repulsion that is stronger than their attractive nuclear interaction, so proton-only nuclei are unstable (see diproton and neutron–proton ratio). Neutrons bind with protons and one another in the nucleus via the nuclear force, effectively moderating the repulsive forces between the protons and stabilizing the nucleus. Heavy nuclei carry a large positive charge, hence they require "extra" neutrons to be stable.

While a free neutron is unstable and a free proton is stable, within nuclei neutrons are often stable and protons are sometimes unstable. When bound within a nucleus, nucleons can decay by the beta decay process. The neutrons and protons in a nucleus form a quantum mechanical system according to the nuclear shell model. Protons and neutrons of a nuclide are organized into discrete hierarchical energy levels with unique quantum numbers. Nucleon decay within a nucleus can occur if allowed by basic energy conservation and quantum mechanical constraints. The decay products, that is, the emitted particles, carry away the energy excess as a nucleon falls from one quantum state to one with less energy, while the neutron (or proton) changes to a proton (or neutron).

For a neutron to decay, the resulting proton requires an available state at lower energy than the initial neutron state. In stable nuclei the possible lower energy states are all filled, meaning each state is occupied by a pair of protons, one with spin up, another with spin down. When all available proton states are filled, the Pauli exclusion principle disallows the decay of a neutron to a proton. The situation is similar to electrons of an atom, where electrons that occupy distinct atomic orbitals are prevented by the exclusion principle from decaying to lower, already-occupied, energy states. The stability of matter is a consequence of these constraints.

The decay of a neutron within a nuclide is illustrated by the decay of the carbon isotope carbon-14, which has 6 protons and 8 neutrons. With its excess of neutrons, this isotope decays by beta decay to nitrogen-14 (7 protons, 7 neutrons), a process with a half-life of about 5,730 years. Nitrogen-14 is stable.

=== Free neutron ===
Neutrons are tightly bound in atomic nuclei, requiring MeV sized energies to escape. Once free, neutrons decay in a quarter of an hour on average. Thus free neutrons are rare compared to other components of atoms: electrons are freed by heating a light bulb filament and protons are freed in rapid hydrogen gas combustion. Moreover, once freed in say a nuclear reactor, the charge-free neutrons are difficult to direct, confine, or detect.

The neutron has a mean-square radius of about 0.8×10^{−15} m, or 0.8 fm, and it is a spin-1/2 fermion. The neutron has no measurable electric charge. With its positive electric charge, the proton is directly influenced by electric fields, whereas the neutron is unaffected by electric fields. The neutron has a magnetic moment, however, so it is influenced by magnetic fields.

=== Dineutrons and tetraneutrons ===
The dineutron is considered a component in neutron-rich ^{16}Be nuclei and an unbound state with lifetimes less than 10^{−22} seconds. The first evidence for this state was reported by Haddock et al. in 1965.

Evidence for unbound clusters of 4 neutrons, or tetraneutron as resonances in the disintegration of beryllium-14 nuclei, in ^{8}He–^{8}Be interactions, and collisions of ^{4}He nuclei give an estimated lifetime around 10^{−22} seconds. These discoveries should deepen our understanding of the nuclear forces.

=== Neutron stars and neutron matter ===
At extremely high pressures and temperatures, nucleons and electrons are believed to collapse into bulk neutronic matter, called neutron matter. This is presumed to happen in neutron stars.

The extreme pressure inside a neutron star may deform the neutrons into a cubic symmetry, allowing tighter packing of neutrons.

== Composition ==
The principal Feynman diagram for β^{−} decay of a neutron into a proton, electron, and electron antineutrino via an intermediate heavy W^{−} boson

The principal Feynman diagram for β^{+} decay of a proton into a neutron, positron, and electron neutrino via an intermediate heavy W^{+} boson

Within the theoretical framework of the Standard Model for particle physics, a neutron comprises two down quarks with charge −1/3e and one up quark with charge +2/3e. The neutron is therefore a composite particle classified as a hadron. The neutron is also classified as a baryon, because it is composed of three valence quarks. The finite size of the neutron and its magnetic moment both indicate that the neutron is a composite, rather than elementary, particle.

The quarks of the neutron are held together by the strong force, mediated by gluons. The nuclear force results from secondary effects of the more fundamental strong force.

The only possible decay mode for the neutron that obeys the conservation law for the baryon number is for one of the neutron's quarks to change flavour (through a Cabibbo–Kobayashi–Maskawa matrix) via the weak interaction. The decay of one of the neutron's down quarks into a lighter up quark can be achieved by the emission of a W boson. By this process, the Standard Model description of beta decay, the neutron decays into a proton (which contains one down and two up quarks), an electron, and an electron antineutrino.

The decay of the proton to a neutron occurs similarly through the weak force. The decay of one of the proton's up quarks into a down quark can be achieved by the emission of a W boson. The proton decays into a neutron, a positron, and an electron neutrino. This reaction can only occur within an atomic nucleus which has a quantum state at lower energy available for the created neutron.

A schematic of the nucleus of an atom indicating β^{−} radiation, the emission of a fast electron from the nucleus. The decay also creates an antineutrino (omitted) and converts a neutron to a proton within the nucleus. The inset shows beta decay of a free neutron; an electron and antineutrino are created in this process.

=== Beta decay ===
Neutrons and protons within a nucleus behave similarly and can exchange their identities by similar reactions. These reactions are a form of radioactive decay known as beta decay. Beta decay, in which neutrons decay to protons, or vice versa, is governed by the weak force, and it requires the emission or absorption of electrons and neutrinos, or their antiparticles. The neutron and proton decay reactions are:

n^{0} → p^{+} + e^{−} + ν̅_{e}

where p^{+}, e^{−}, and ν̅_{e} denote the proton, electron and electron anti-neutrino decay products, and

p^{+} → n^{0} + e^{+} + ν_{e}

where n^{0}, e^{+}, and ν_{e} denote the neutron, positron and electron neutrino decay products.

The electron and positron produced in these reactions are historically known as beta particles, denoted β^{−} or β^{+} respectively, lending the name to the decay process. In these reactions, the original particle is not composed of the product particles; rather, the product particles are created at the instant of the reaction.

"Beta decay" reactions can also occur by the capture of a lepton by the nucleon. The transformation of a proton to a neutron inside of a nucleus is possible through electron capture:

p^{+} + e^{−} → n^{0} + ν_{e}

A rarer reaction, inverse beta decay, involves the capture of a neutrino by a nucleon. Rarer still, positron capture by neutrons can occur in the high-temperature environment of stars.

== Properties ==
=== Mass ===
The mass of a neutron cannot be directly determined by mass spectrometry since it has no electric charge. But since the masses of a proton and of a deuteron can be measured with a mass spectrometer, the mass of a neutron can be deduced by subtracting proton mass from deuteron mass, with the difference being the mass of the neutron plus the binding energy of deuterium (expressed as a positive emitted energy). The latter can be directly measured by measuring the energy ($B_d$) of the single 2.224 MeV gamma photon emitted when a deuteron is formed by a proton capturing a neutron (this is exothermic and happens with zero-energy neutrons). The small recoil kinetic energy ($E_{rd}$) of the deuteron (about 0.06% of the total energy) must also be accounted for.
$$m_n= m_d - m_p + B_d - E_{rd}$$

The energy of the gamma ray can be measured to high precision by X-ray diffraction techniques, as was first done by Bell and Elliot in 1948. The best modern (1986) values for neutron mass by this technique are provided by Greene, et al. These give a neutron mass of:

m_{neutron} = 1.00866491606(40) Da

The value for the neutron mass in MeV is less accurately known, due to less accuracy in the known conversion of Da to MeV/c^{2}:

m_{neutron} = 939.56542194(48) MeV/c^{2}

Another method to determine the mass of a neutron starts from the beta decay of the neutron, when the momenta of the resulting proton and electron are measured.

=== Spin ===
The neutron is a spin 1/2 particle, that is, it is a fermion with intrinsic angular momentum equal to 1/2 ħ, where ħ is the reduced Planck constant. For many years after the discovery of the neutron, its exact spin was ambiguous. Although it was assumed to be a spin 1/2 Dirac particle, the possibility that the neutron was a spin 3/2 particle lingered. The interactions of the neutron's magnetic moment with an external magnetic field were exploited to finally determine the spin of the neutron. In 1949, Hughes and Burgy measured neutrons reflected from a ferromagnetic mirror and found that the angular distribution of the reflections was consistent with spin 1/2. In 1954, Sherwood, Stephenson, and Bernstein employed neutrons in a Stern–Gerlach experiment that used a magnetic field to separate the neutron spin states. They recorded two such spin states, consistent with a spin 1/2 particle.

As a fermion, the neutron is subject to the Pauli exclusion principle; two neutrons cannot have the same quantum numbers. This is the source of the degeneracy pressure which counteracts gravity in neutron stars and prevents them from forming black holes.

=== Magnetic moment ===
Even though the neutron is a neutral particle, the magnetic moment of a neutron is not zero. The neutron is not affected by electric fields, but it is affected by magnetic fields. The value for the neutron's magnetic moment was first directly measured by Luis Alvarez and Felix Bloch at Berkeley, California, in 1940. Alvarez and Bloch determined the magnetic moment of the neutron to be μ_{n}= −1.93(2) μ_{N}, where μ_{N} is the nuclear magneton. The neutron's magnetic moment has a negative value, because its orientation is opposite to the neutron's spin.

The magnetic moment of the neutron is an indication of its quark substructure and internal charge distribution. In the quark model for hadrons, the neutron is composed of one up quark (charge +2/3 e) and two down quarks (charge −1/3 e). The magnetic moment of the neutron can be modeled as a sum of the magnetic moments of the constituent quarks. The calculation assumes that the quarks behave like point-like Dirac particles, each having their own magnetic moment. Simplistically, the magnetic moment of the neutron can be viewed as resulting from the vector sum of the three quark magnetic moments, plus the orbital magnetic moments caused by the movement of the three charged quarks within the neutron.

In one of the early successes of the Standard Model, in 1964 Mirza A.B. Beg, Benjamin W. Lee, and Abraham Pais calculated the ratio of proton to neutron magnetic moments to be −3/2 (or a ratio of −1.5), which agrees with the experimental value to within 3%. The measured value for this ratio is −1.45989805(34).

The above treatment compares neutrons with protons, allowing the complex behavior of quarks to be subtracted out between models, and merely exploring what the effects would be of differing quark charges (or quark type). Such calculations are enough to show that the interior of neutrons is very much like that of protons, save for the difference in quark composition with a down quark in the neutron replacing an up quark in the proton.

The neutron magnetic moment can be roughly computed by assuming a simple nonrelativistic, quantum mechanical wavefunction for baryons composed of three quarks. A straightforward calculation gives fairly accurate estimates for the magnetic moments of neutrons, protons, and other baryons. For a neutron, the result of this calculation is that the magnetic moment of the neutron is given by μ_{n}= 4/3 μ_{d} − 1/3 μ_{u}, where μ_{d} and μ_{u} are the magnetic moments for the down and up quarks, respectively. This result combines the intrinsic magnetic moments of the quarks with their orbital magnetic moments, and assumes the three quarks are in a particular, dominant quantum state.

Baryon	Magnetic moment of quark model	Computed ($\mu_\mathrm{N}$)	Observed ($\mu_\mathrm{N}$)
p	4/3 μ_{u} − 1/3 μ_{d}	2.79	2.793
n	4/3 μ_{d} − 1/3 μ_{u}	−1.86	−1.913

The results of this calculation are encouraging, but the masses of the up or down quarks were assumed to be 1/3 the mass of a nucleon. The masses of the quarks are actually only about 1% that of a nucleon. The discrepancy stems from the complexity of the Standard Model for nucleons, where most of their mass originates in the gluon fields, virtual particles, and their associated energy that are essential aspects of the strong force. Furthermore, the complex system of quarks and gluons that constitute a neutron requires a relativistic treatment. But the nucleon magnetic moment has been successfully computed numerically from first principles, including all of the effects mentioned and using more realistic values for the quark masses. The calculation gave results that were in fair agreement with measurement, but it required significant computing resources.

=== Electric charge ===
The total electric charge of the neutron is 0 e. This zero value has been tested experimentally, and the present experimental limit for the charge of the neutron is −2(8)×10^{−22} e, or −3(13)×10^{−41} C. This value is consistent with zero, given the experimental uncertainties (indicated in parentheses). By comparison, the charge of the proton is +1 e.

=== Electric dipole moment ===
The Standard Model of particle physics predicts a tiny separation of positive and negative charge within the neutron leading to a permanent electric dipole moment. But the predicted value is well below the current sensitivity of experiments. From several unsolved puzzles in particle physics, it is clear that the Standard Model is not the final and full description of all particles and their interactions. New theories going beyond the Standard Model generally lead to much larger predictions for the electric dipole moment of the neutron. Currently, there are at least four experiments trying to measure for the first time a finite neutron electric dipole moment, including:

- Cryogenic neutron EDM experiment being set up at the Institut Laue–Langevin
- n2EDM experiment under construction at the UCN source at the Paul Scherrer Institute
- nEDM experiment being envisaged at the Spallation Neutron Source
- nEDM experiment being built at the Institut Laue–Langevin

=== Antineutron ===
The antineutron is the antiparticle of the neutron. It was discovered by Bruce Cork in 1956, a year after the antiproton was discovered. Neutrons have baryon number equal to 1 while antineutrons have -1. While all measured particle interactions conserve baryon number, matter dominates over antimatter in the cosmos suggesting that there must be some way to change the baryon number. One proposed mechanism is neutron-antineutron oscillations which might be detectable. The lower limit on the period of oscillations 0.86×10^{8} s (90% CL) was obtained using cold neutrons. Ultracold neutrons may increase the sensitivity by 10–40 times, depending on the model of neutron reflection from walls.

== Detection ==
The common means of detecting a charged particle by looking for a track of ionization (such as in a cloud chamber) does not work for neutrons directly. Neutrons that elastically scatter off atoms can create an ionization track that is detectable, but the experiments are not as simple to carry out; other means for detecting neutrons, consisting of allowing them to interact with atomic nuclei, are more commonly used. The commonly used methods to detect neutrons can therefore be categorized according to the nuclear processes relied upon, mainly neutron capture or elastic scattering.

=== Neutron detection by neutron capture ===
A common method for detecting neutrons involves converting the energy released from neutron capture reactions into electrical signals. Certain nuclides have a high neutron capture cross section, which is the probability of absorbing a neutron. Upon neutron capture, the compound nucleus emits more easily detectable radiation, for example an alpha particle, which is then detected. The nuclides ^{3}He, ^{6}Li, ^{10}B, ^{233}U, ^{235}U, ^{237}Np, and ^{239}Pu are useful for this purpose.

=== Neutron detection by elastic scattering ===
Neutrons can elastically scatter off nuclei, causing the struck nucleus to recoil. Kinematically, a neutron can transfer more energy to a light nucleus such as hydrogen or helium than to a heavier nucleus. Detectors relying on elastic scattering are called fast neutron detectors. Recoiling nuclei can ionize and excite further atoms through collisions. Charge and/or scintillation light produced in this way can be collected to produce a detected signal. A major challenge in fast neutron detection is discerning such signals from erroneous signals produced by gamma radiation in the same detector. Methods such as pulse shape discrimination can be used in distinguishing neutron signals from gamma-ray signals, although certain inorganic scintillator-based detectors have been developed to selectively detect neutrons in mixed radiation fields inherently without any additional techniques.

Fast neutron detectors have the advantage of not requiring a moderator, and are therefore capable of measuring the neutron's energy, time of arrival, and in certain cases direction of incidence.

== Sources and production ==
Free neutrons are unstable, although they have the longest half-life of any unstable subatomic particle by several orders of magnitude. Their half-life is still only about 10 minutes, so they can be obtained only from sources that produce them continuously.

Natural neutron background. A small natural background flux of free neutrons exists everywhere on Earth. In the atmosphere and deep into the ocean, the "neutron background" is caused by muons produced by cosmic ray interaction with the atmosphere. These high-energy muons are capable of penetration to considerable depths in water and soil. There, in striking atomic nuclei, among other reactions they induce spallation reactions in which a neutron is liberated from the nucleus. Within the Earth's crust a second source is neutrons produced primarily by spontaneous fission of uranium and thorium present in crustal minerals. The neutron background is not strong enough to be a biological hazard, but it is of importance to very high resolution particle detectors that are looking for very rare events, such as (hypothesized) interactions that might be caused by particles of dark matter. Recent research has shown that even thunderstorms can produce neutrons with energies of up to several tens of MeV. Recent research has shown that the fluence of these neutrons lies between 10^{−9} and 10^{−13} per ms and per m^{2} depending on the detection altitude. The energy of most of these neutrons, even with initial energies of 20 MeV, decreases down to the keV range within 1 ms.

Even stronger neutron background radiation is produced at the surface of Mars, where the atmosphere is thick enough to generate neutrons from cosmic ray muon production and neutron-spallation, but not thick enough to provide significant protection from the neutrons produced. These neutrons not only produce a Martian surface neutron radiation hazard from direct downward-going neutron radiation but may also produce a significant hazard from reflection of neutrons from the Martian surface, which will produce reflected neutron radiation penetrating upward into a Martian craft or habitat from the floor.

Sources of neutrons for research. These include certain types of radioactive decay (spontaneous fission and neutron emission), and from certain nuclear reactions. Convenient nuclear reactions include tabletop reactions such as natural alpha and gamma bombardment of certain nuclides, often beryllium or deuterium, and induced nuclear fission, such as occurs in nuclear reactors. In addition, high-energy nuclear reactions (such as occur in cosmic radiation showers or accelerator collisions) also produce neutrons from disintegration of target nuclei. Small (tabletop) particle accelerators optimized to produce free neutrons in this way, are called neutron generators.

In practice, the most commonly used small laboratory sources of neutrons use radioactive decay to power neutron production. One noted neutron-producing radioisotope, californium-252 decays (half-life 2.65 years) by spontaneous fission 3% of the time with production of 3.7 neutrons per fission, and is used alone as a neutron source from this process. Nuclear reaction sources (that involve two materials) powered by radioisotopes use an alpha decay source plus a beryllium target, or else a source of high-energy gamma radiation from a source that undergoes beta decay followed by gamma decay, which produces photoneutrons on interaction of the high-energy gamma ray with ordinary stable beryllium, or else with the deuterium in heavy water. A popular source of the latter type is radioactive antimony-124 plus beryllium, a system with a half-life of 60.9 days, which can be constructed from natural antimony (which is 42.8% stable antimony-123) by activating it with neutrons in a nuclear reactor, then transported to where the neutron source is needed.

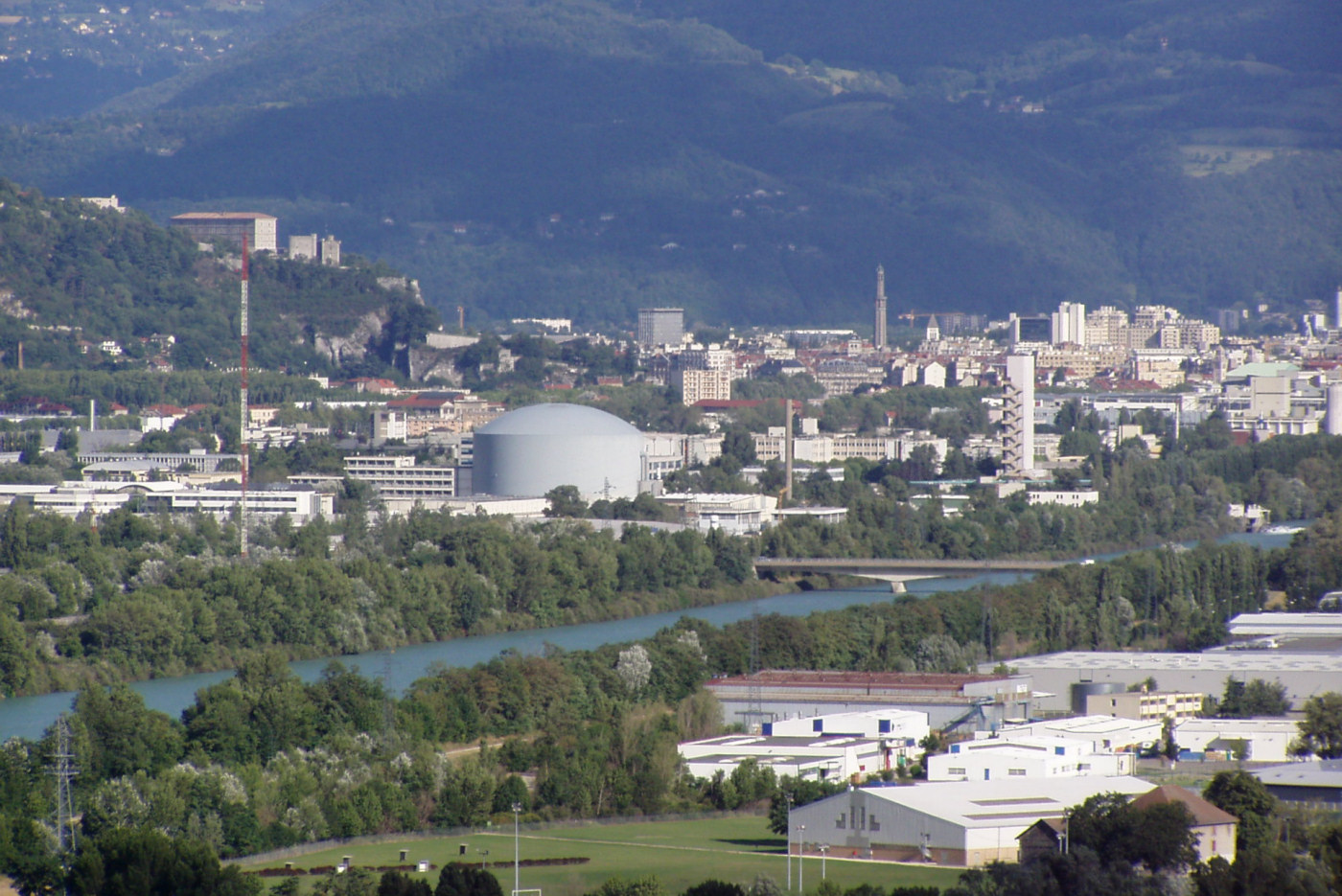
Institut Laue–Langevin (ILL) in Grenoble, France – a major neutron research facility

Nuclear fission reactors naturally produce free neutrons; their role is to sustain the energy-producing chain reaction. The intense neutron radiation can also be used to produce various radioisotopes through the process of neutron activation, which is a type of neutron capture.

Experimental nuclear fusion reactors produce free neutrons as a waste product. But it is these neutrons that possess most of the energy and converting that energy to a useful form has proved a difficult engineering challenge. Fusion reactors that generate neutrons are likely to create radioactive waste, but the waste is composed of neutron-activated lighter isotopes, which have relatively short (50–100 years) decay periods as compared to typical half-lives of 10,000 years for fission waste, which is long due primarily to the long half-life of alpha-emitting transuranic actinides. Some nuclear fusion-fission hybrids are proposed to make use of those neutrons to either maintain a subcritical reactor or to aid in nuclear transmutation of harmful long lived nuclear waste to shorter lived or stable nuclides.

=== Neutron beams and modification of beams after production ===
Free neutron beams are obtained from neutron sources by neutron transport. For access to intense neutron sources, researchers must go to a specialized neutron facility that operates a research reactor or a spallation source.

The neutron's lack of total electric charge makes it difficult to steer or accelerate them. Charged particles can be accelerated, decelerated, or deflected by electric or magnetic fields. These methods have little effect on neutrons. But some effects may be attained by use of inhomogeneous magnetic fields because of the neutron's magnetic moment. Neutrons can be controlled by methods that include moderation, reflection, and velocity selection. Thermal neutrons can be polarized by transmission through magnetic materials in a method analogous to the Faraday effect for photons. Cold neutrons of wavelengths of 6–7 angstroms can be produced in beams of a high degree of polarization, by use of magnetic mirrors and magnetized interference filters.

== Applications ==
=== Nuclear energy ===
Because of the strength of the nuclear force at short distances, the nuclear energy binding nucleons is many orders of magnitude greater than the electromagnetic energy binding electrons in atoms. In nuclear fission, the absorption of a neutron by some heavy nuclides (such as uranium-235) can cause the nuclide to become unstable and break into lighter nuclides and additional neutrons. The positively charged light nuclides, or "fission fragments", then repel, releasing electromagnetic potential energy. If this reaction occurs within a mass of fissile material, the additional neutrons cause additional fission events, inducing a cascade known as a nuclear chain reaction. For a given mass of fissile material, such nuclear reactions release energy that is approximately ten million times that from an equivalent mass of a conventional chemical explosive. Ultimately, the ability of the nuclear force to store energy arising from the electromagnetic repulsion of nuclear components is the basis for most of the energy that makes nuclear reactors or bombs possible; most of the energy released from fission is the kinetic energy of the fission fragments.

The neutron plays an important role in many nuclear reactions. For example, neutron capture often results in neutron activation, inducing radioactivity. In particular, knowledge of neutrons and their behavior has been important in the development of nuclear reactors and nuclear weapons. The fissioning of elements like uranium-235 and plutonium-239 is caused by their absorption of neutrons.

=== Other uses ===
Cold, thermal, and hot neutron radiation is commonly employed in neutron scattering facilities for neutron diffraction, small-angle neutron scattering, and neutron reflectometry. Slow neutron matter waves exhibit properties similar to geometrical and wave optics of light, including reflection, refraction, diffraction, and interference. Neutrons are complementary to X-rays in terms of atomic contrasts by different scattering cross sections; sensitivity to magnetism; energy range for inelastic neutron spectroscopy; and deep penetration into matter.

The development of "neutron lenses" based on total internal reflection within hollow glass capillary tubes or by reflection from dimpled aluminum plates has driven ongoing research into neutron microscopy and neutron/gamma ray tomography.

A major use of neutrons is to excite delayed and prompt gamma rays from elements in materials. This forms the basis of neutron activation analysis (NAA) and prompt gamma neutron activation analysis (PGNAA). NAA is most often used to analyze small samples of materials in a nuclear reactor whilst PGNAA is most often used to analyze subterranean rocks around bore holes and industrial bulk materials on conveyor belts.

Another use of neutron emitters is the detection of light nuclei, in particular the hydrogen found in water molecules. When a fast neutron collides with a light nucleus, it loses a large fraction of its energy. By measuring the rate at which slow neutrons return to the probe after reflecting off of hydrogen nuclei, a neutron probe may determine the water content in soil.

== Medical therapies ==
Because neutron radiation is both penetrating and ionizing, it can be exploited for medical treatments. However, neutron radiation can have the unfortunate side-effect of leaving the affected area radioactive. Neutron tomography is therefore not a viable medical application.

Fast neutron therapy uses high-energy neutrons typically greater than 20 MeV to treat cancer. Radiation therapy of cancers is based upon the biological response of cells to ionizing radiation. If radiation is delivered in small sessions to damage cancerous areas, normal tissue will have time to repair itself, while tumor cells often cannot. Neutron radiation can deliver energy to a cancerous region at a rate an order of magnitude larger than gamma radiation.

Beams of low-energy neutrons were studied in an attempt to treat cancer with boron neutron capture therapy. In this therapy, the patient is given a drug that contains boron and that preferentially accumulates in the tumor to be targeted. The tumor is then bombarded with very low-energy neutrons (although often higher than thermal energy). Neutrons captured by boron-10 isotope decays to produce lithium-7 and an alpha particle both of which have sufficient energy to kill the malignant cell, but insufficient range to damage nearby cells. For such a therapy to be applied to the treatment of cancer, a neutron source having an intensity of the order of a billion (10^{9}) neutrons per second per cm^{2} is preferred. Such fluxes require a research nuclear reactor. Clinical trials over 5 decades have failed to result in a viable treatment with this technique.

== Health risks ==
Exposure to free neutrons can be hazardous, since the interaction of neutrons with molecules in the body can cause disruption to molecules and atoms, and can also cause reactions that give rise to other forms of radiation (such as protons). The normal precautions of radiation protection apply: Avoid exposure, stay as far from the source as possible, and keep exposure time to a minimum. But particular thought must be given to how to protect from neutron exposure. For other types of radiation, e.g., alpha particles, beta particles, or gamma rays, material of a high atomic number and with high density makes for good shielding; frequently, lead is used. However, this approach will not work with neutrons, since the absorption of neutrons does not increase straightforwardly with atomic number, as it does with alpha, beta, and gamma radiation. Instead, one needs to look at the particular interactions neutrons have with matter (see the section on detection above). For example, hydrogen-rich materials are often used to shield against neutrons, since ordinary hydrogen both scatters and slows neutrons. This often means that simple concrete blocks or even paraffin-loaded plastic blocks afford better protection from neutrons than do far more dense materials. After slowing, neutrons may then be absorbed with an isotope that has high affinity for slow neutrons without causing secondary capture radiation, such as lithium-6.

Hydrogen-rich ordinary water effects neutron absorption in nuclear fission reactors: Usually, neutrons are so strongly absorbed by normal water that fuel enrichment with a fissionable isotope is required. (The number of neutrons produced per fission depends primarily on the fission products. The average is roughly 2.5 to 3.0 and at least one, on average, must evade capture in order to sustain the nuclear chain reaction.) The deuterium in heavy water has a very much lower absorption affinity for neutrons than does protium (normal light hydrogen). Deuterium is, therefore, used in CANDU-type reactors, in order to slow (moderate) neutron velocity, to increase the probability of nuclear fission compared to neutron capture.

== Neutron temperature ==
The energy of free neutrons are characterized by their temperature as given by their Maxwell–Boltzmann distribution. For example, thermal neutrons have with kT = 0.0253 eV (4.0×10^{−21} J) corresponding to room temperature, giving them a characteristic (not average, or median) speed of 2.2 km/s. In many substances, thermal neutron reactions show a much larger effective cross-section than reactions involving faster neutrons, and thermal neutrons can therefore be absorbed more readily (i.e., with higher probability) by any atomic nuclei that they collide with, creating a heavier – and often unstable – isotope of the chemical element as a result. Most fission reactors use a neutron moderator to slow down, or thermalize, the neutrons that are emitted by nuclear fission so that they are more easily captured, causing further fission.

Cold and even ultra-cold neutrons can be created by thermalizing with cryogenic materials. Higher temperature neutrons arise from nuclear fission and nuclear fusion. The highest energies arise from cosmic ray collisions.

== See also ==
- Ionizing radiation
- Isotope
- List of particles
- Neutron radiation and the Sievert radiation scale
- Neutronium
- Nuclear reaction
- Nucleosynthesis
  - Neutron capture nucleosynthesis
  - R-process
  - S-process
- Thermal-neutron reactor

=== Neutron sources ===
- Neutron generator
- Neutron source

=== Processes involving neutrons ===
- Neutron bomb
- Neutron diffraction
- Neutron flux
- Neutron imaging
- Neutron transport
- Cosmogenic radionuclide dating
