= Lorentz force =

Force acting on charged particles in electric and magnetic fields

Lorentz force acting on fast-moving charged particles in a bubble chamber. Positive and negative charge trajectories curve in opposite directions.

In electromagnetism, the Lorentz force is the force exerted on a charged particle by electric and magnetic fields. It determines how charged particles move in electromagnetic environments and underlies many physical phenomena, from the operation of electric motors and particle accelerators to the behavior of plasmas.

The Lorentz force has two components. The electric force acts in the direction of the electric field for positive charges and opposite to it for negative charges, tending to accelerate the particle in a straight line. The magnetic force is perpendicular to both the particle's velocity and the magnetic field, and it causes the particle to move along a curved trajectory, often circular or helical in form, depending on the directions of the fields.

Variations on the force law describe the magnetic force on a current-carrying wire (sometimes called Laplace force), and the electromotive force in a wire loop moving through a magnetic field, as described by Faraday's law of induction.

Together with Maxwell's equations, which describe how electric and magnetic fields are generated by charges and currents, the Lorentz force law forms the foundation of classical electrodynamics. While the law remains valid in special relativity, it breaks down at small scales where quantum effects become important. In particular, the intrinsic spin of particles gives rise to additional interactions with electromagnetic fields that are not accounted for by the Lorentz force.

Historians suggest that the law is implicit in a paper by James Clerk Maxwell, published in 1865. Hendrik Lorentz arrived at a complete derivation in 1895, identifying the contribution of the electric force a few years after Oliver Heaviside correctly identified the contribution of the magnetic force.

== Definition and properties ==
=== Point particle ===
Lorentz force F on a charged particle (of charge q) in motion (instantaneous velocity v). The E field and B field vary in space and time.

The Lorentz force F acting on a point particle with electric charge q, moving with velocity v, due to an external electric field E and magnetic field B, is given by (SI definition of quantities (Note: In SI units, B is measured in teslas (symbol: T). In Gaussian-cgs units, B is measured in gauss (symbol: G). H is measured in amperes per metre (A/m) in SI units, and in oersteds (Oe) in cgs units.)):

$\mathbf{F} = q \left(\mathbf{E} + \mathbf{v} \times \mathbf{B}\right)$

Here, × is the vector cross product, and all quantities in bold are vectors. In component form, the force is written as:
$$\begin{align}
F_x &= q \left(E_x + v_y B_z - v_z B_y\right), \\[0.5ex]
F_y &= q \left(E_y + v_z B_x - v_x B_z\right), \\[0.5ex]
F_z &= q \left(E_z + v_x B_y - v_y B_x\right).
\end{align}$$

In general, the electric and magnetic fields depend on both position and time. As a charged particle moves through space, the force acting on it at any given moment depends on its current location, velocity, and the instantaneous values of the fields at that location. Therefore, explicitly, the Lorentz force can be written as:
$$\mathbf{F}\left(\mathbf{r}(t),\dot\mathbf{r}(t),t,q\right) \, = \, q\left[\mathbf{E}(\mathbf{r},t) + \dot\mathbf{r}(t) \times \mathbf{B}(\mathbf{r},t)\right]$$
in which r is the position vector of the charged particle, t is time, and the overdot is a time derivative.

The total electromagnetic force consists of two parts: the electric force qE, which acts in the direction of the electric field and accelerates the particle linearly, and the magnetic force q(v × B), which acts perpendicularly to both the velocity and the magnetic field. Some sources refer to the Lorentz force as the sum of both components, while others use the term to refer to the magnetic part alone.

The direction of the magnetic force is often determined using the right-hand rule: if the index finger points in the direction of the velocity, and the middle finger points in the direction of the magnetic field, then the thumb points in the direction of the force (for a positive charge). In a uniform magnetic field, this results in circular or helical trajectories, known as cyclotron motion.

In many practical situations, such as the motion of electrons or ions in a plasma, the effect of a magnetic field can be approximated as a superposition of two components: a relatively fast circular motion around a point called the guiding center, and a relatively slow drift of this point. The drift speeds may differ for various species depending on their charge states, masses, or temperatures. These differences may lead to electric currents or chemical separation.

While the magnetic force affects the direction of a particle's motion, it does no mechanical work on the particle. The rate at which the energy is transferred from the electromagnetic field to the particle is given by the dot product of the particle's velocity and the force:
$$\mathbf{v}\cdot\mathbf{F} = q\mathbf{v}\cdot(\mathbf{E} + \mathbf{v} \times \mathbf{B}) = q \, \mathbf{v} \cdot \mathbf{E}.$$
Here, the magnetic term vanishes because a vector is always perpendicular to its cross product with another vector; the scalar triple product $\mathbf{v}\cdot (\mathbf{v} \times \mathbf{B})$ is zero. Thus, only the electric field can transfer energy to or from a particle and change its kinetic energy.

Some textbooks use the Lorentz force law as the fundamental definition of the electric and magnetic fields. That is, the fields E and B are uniquely defined at each point in space and time by the hypothetical force F a test particle of charge q and velocity v would experience there, even if no charge is present. This definition remains valid even for particles approaching the speed of light (that is, magnitude of v, |v| ≈ c). However, some argue that using the Lorentz force law as the definition of the electric and magnetic fields is not necessarily the most fundamental approach possible.

=== Continuous charge distribution ===
Lorentz force (per unit 3-volume) f on a continuous charge distribution (charge density ρ) in motion. The 3-current density J corresponds to the motion of the charge element dq in volume element dV and varies throughout the continuum.

The Lorentz force law can also be given in terms of continuous charge distributions, such as those found in conductors or plasmas. For a small element of a moving charge distribution with charge $\mathrm{d}q$, the infinitesimal force is given by:
$$\mathrm{d}\mathbf{F} = \mathrm{d}q\left(\mathbf{E} + \mathbf{v} \times \mathbf{B}\right)$$
Dividing both sides by the volume $\mathrm{d}V$ of the charge element gives the force density
$$\mathbf{f} = \rho\left(\mathbf{E} + \mathbf{v} \times \mathbf{B}\right),$$
where $\rho$ is the charge density and $\mathbf{f}$ is the force per unit volume. Introducing the current density $\mathbf{J} = \rho \mathbf{v}$, this can be rewritten as:

$\mathbf{f} = \rho \mathbf{E} + \mathbf{J} \times \mathbf{B}$

The total force is the volume integral over the charge distribution:
$$\mathbf{F} = \int \left ( \rho \mathbf{E} + \mathbf{J} \times \mathbf{B} \right)\mathrm{d}V.$$

Using Maxwell's equations and vector calculus identities, the force density can be reformulated to eliminate explicit reference to the charge and current densities. The force density can then be written in terms of the electromagnetic fields and their derivatives:
$$\mathbf{f} = \nabla\cdot\boldsymbol{\sigma} - \dfrac{1}{c^2} \dfrac{\partial \mathbf{S}}{\partial t}$$
where $\boldsymbol{\sigma}$ is the Maxwell stress tensor, $\nabla \cdot$ denotes the tensor divergence, $c$ is the speed of light, and $\mathbf{S}$ is the Poynting vector. This form of the force law relates the energy flux in the fields to the force exerted on a charge distribution. (See Covariant formulation of classical electromagnetism for more details.)

The power density corresponding to the Lorentz force, the rate of energy transfer to the material, is given by:
$$\mathbf{J} \cdot \mathbf{E}.$$

Inside a material, the total charge and current densities can be separated into free and bound parts. In terms of free charge density $\rho_{\rm f}$, free current density $\mathbf{J}_{\rm f}$, polarization $\mathbf{P}$, and magnetization $\mathbf{M}$, the force density becomes
$$\mathbf{f} = \left(\rho_{\rm f} - \nabla \cdot \mathbf P\right) \mathbf{E} + \left(\mathbf{J}_{{\rm f}} + \nabla\times\mathbf{M} + \frac{\partial\mathbf{P}}{\partial t}\right) \times \mathbf{B}.$$
This form accounts for the torque applied to a permanent magnet by the magnetic field. The associated power density is
$$\left(\mathbf{J}_f + \nabla\times\mathbf{M} + \frac{\partial\mathbf{P}}{\partial t}\right) \cdot \mathbf{E}.$$

=== Formulation in the Gaussian system ===
The above-mentioned formulae use the conventions for the definition of the electric and magnetic field used with the SI, which is the most common. However, other conventions with the same physics (i.e. forces on e.g. an electron) are possible and used. In the conventions used with the older CGS-Gaussian units, which are somewhat more common among some theoretical physicists as well as condensed matter experimentalists, one has instead
$$\mathbf{F} = q_\mathrm{G} \left(\mathbf{E}_\mathrm{G} + \frac{\mathbf{v}}{c} \times \mathbf{B}_\mathrm{G}\right),$$
where c is the speed of light. Although this equation looks slightly different, it is equivalent, since one has the following relations:
$$q_\mathrm{G} = \frac{q_\mathrm{SI}}{\sqrt{4\pi \varepsilon_0}},\quad
\mathbf E_\mathrm{G} = \sqrt{4\pi\varepsilon_0}\,\mathbf E_\mathrm{SI},\quad
\mathbf B_\mathrm{G} = {\sqrt{4\pi /\mu_0}}\,{\mathbf B_\mathrm{SI}}, \quad
c = \frac{1}{\sqrt{\varepsilon_0 \mu_0}}.$$
where ε_{0} is the vacuum permittivity and μ_{0} the vacuum permeability. In practice, the subscripts "G" and "SI" are omitted, and the used convention (and unit) must be determined from context.

== Force on a current-carrying wire ==
Right-hand rule for the force on a current-carrying wire in a magnetic field B

When a wire carrying a steady electric current is placed in an external magnetic field, each of the moving charges in the wire experience the Lorentz force. Together, these forces produce a net macroscopic force on the wire. For a straight, stationary wire in a uniform magnetic field, this force is given by:
$$\mathbf{F} = I \boldsymbol{\ell} \times \mathbf{B} ,$$
where I is the current and ℓ is a vector whose magnitude is the length of the wire, and whose direction is along the wire, aligned with the direction of the current.

The derivation of this equation is straight forward. Consider a conductor of length ℓ, cross section A, and charge q due to electric current I. If this conductor is placed in a magnetic field of magnitude B that makes an angle θ with the velocity of charges in the conductor, the force exerted on a single charge q is:

$$F_q = qvB \sin\theta,$$

so, for N charges where $N = n \ell A ,$ (here n is the density of charges in the wire) the force exerted on the conductor is

$$F = N F_q = q v B n\ell A \sin\theta = B I \ell \sin\theta,$$
where the current, I = nqvA. This is the same as the equation above using the definition of the cross product.

If the wire is not straight or the magnetic field is non-uniform, the total force can be computed by applying the formula to each infinitesimal segment of wire $\mathrm d \boldsymbol \ell$, then adding up all these forces by integration. In this case, the net force on a stationary wire carrying a steady current is

$$\mathbf{F} = I\int (\mathrm{d}\boldsymbol{\ell}\times \mathbf{B}).$$

One application of this is Ampère's force law, which describes the attraction or repulsion between two current-carrying wires. Each wire generates a magnetic field, described by the Biot–Savart law, which exerts a Lorentz force on the other wire. If the currents flow in the same direction, the wires attract; if the currents flow in opposite directions, they repel. This interaction provided the basis of the former definition of the ampere, as the constant current that produces a force of 2 × 10^{−7} newtons per metre between two straight, parallel wires one metre apart.

Another application is an induction motor. The stator winding AC current generates a moving magnetic field which induces a current in the rotor. The subsequent Lorentz force $\mathbf{F}$ acting on the rotor creates a torque, making the motor spin. Hence, though the Lorentz force law does not apply when the magnetic field $\mathbf{B}$ is generated by the current $I$, it does apply when the current $I$ is induced by the movement of magnetic field $\mathbf{B}$.

== Electromagnetic induction ==
Motional EMF, induced by moving a conductor through a magnetic field.

Transformer EMF, induced by a changing magnetic field.

The Lorentz force acting on electric charges in a conducting loop can produce a current by pushing charges around the circuit. This effect is the fundamental mechanism underlying induction motors and generators. It is described in terms of electromotive force (emf), a quantity which plays a central role in the theory of electromagnetic induction. In a simple circuit with resistance $R$, an emf $\mathcal E$ gives rise to a current $I$ according to the Ohm's law $\mathcal E = IR$.

Both components of the Lorentz force—the electric and the magnetic—can contribute to the emf in a circuit, but through different mechanisms. In both cases, the induced emf is described by Faraday's flux rule, which states that the emf around a closed loop is equal to the negative rate of change of the magnetic flux through the loop:
$$\mathcal{E} = -\frac{\mathrm{d}\Phi_B}{\mathrm{d}t}.$$
The magnetic flux $\Phi_B$ is defined as the surface integral of the magnetic field $\mathbf{B}$ over a surface $\mathbf{\Sigma}(t)$ bounded by the loop:

$$\Phi_B = \int_{\Sigma} \mathbf B\cdot {\rm d}\mathbf S$$

A conducting rod moving through a uniform magnetic field. The magnetic component of the Lorentz force pushes electrons to one end, resulting in charge separation.

The flux can change either because the loop moves or deforms over time, or because the field itself varies in time. These two possibilities correspond to the two mechanisms described by the flux rule:

- Motional emf: The circuit moves through a static but non-uniform magnetic field.
- Transformer emf: The circuit remains stationary while the magnetic field changes over time

The sign of the induced emf is given by Lenz's law, which states that the induced current produces a magnetic field opposing the change in the original flux.

The flux rule can be derived from the Maxwell–Faraday equation and the Lorentz force law. In some cases, especially in extended systems, the flux rule may be difficult to apply directly or may not provide a complete description, and the full Lorentz force law must be used. (See inapplicability of Faraday's law.)

=== Motional emf ===
The basic mechanism behind motional emf is illustrated by a conducting rod moving through a magnetic field that is perpendicular to both the rod and its direction of motion. Due to movement in magnetic field, the mobile electrons of the conductor experience the magnetic component (qv × B) of the Lorentz force that drives them along the length of the rod. This leads to a separation of charge between the two ends of the rod. In the steady state, the electric field from the accumulated charge balances the magnetic force.

The flux rule in three cases: (a) motional emf, with moving circuit and a stationary magnetic field (b) stationary circuit, with the source of the magnetic field moving (c) time-dependent magnetic field strength

If the rod is part of a closed conducting loop moving through a nonuniform magnetic field, the same effect can drive a current around the circuit. For instance, suppose the magnetic field is confined to a limited region of space, and the loop initially lies outside this region. As it moves into the field, the area of the loop that encloses magnetic flux increases, and an emf is induced. From the Lorentz force perspective, this is because the field exerts a magnetic force on charge carriers in the parts of the loop entering the region. Once the entire loop lies in a uniform magnetic field and continues at constant speed, the total enclosed flux remains constant, and the emf vanishes. In this situation, magnetic forces on opposite sides of the loop cancel out.

=== Transformer emf ===
A complementary case is transformer emf, which occurs when the conducting loop remains stationary but the magnetic flux through it changes due to a time-varying magnetic field. This can happen in two ways: either the source of the magnetic field moves, altering the field distribution through the fixed loop, or the strength of the magnetic field changes over time at a fixed location, as in the case of a powered electromagnet..

In either situation, no magnetic force acts on the charges, and the emf is entirely due to the electric component (qE) of the Lorentz force. According to the Maxwell–Faraday equation, a time-varying magnetic field produces a circulating electric field, which drives current in the loop. This phenomenon underlies the operation of electrical machines such as synchronous generators. The electric field induced in this way is non-conservative, meaning its line integral around a closed loop is not zero.

=== Relativity ===
From the viewpoint of special relativity, the distinction between motional and transformer emf is frame-dependent. In the laboratory frame, a moving loop in a static field generates emf via magnetic forces. But in a frame moving with the loop, the magnetic field appears time-dependent, and the emf arises from an induced electric field. Einstein's special theory of relativity was partially motivated by the desire to better understand this link between the two effects. In modern terms, electric and magnetic fields are different components of a single electromagnetic field tensor, and a transformation between inertial frames mixes the two.

== History ==
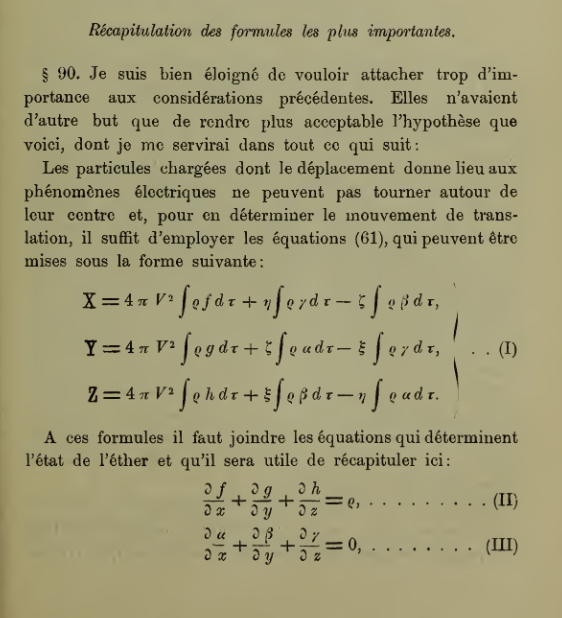
Lorentz's theory of electrons. Formulas for the Lorentz force (I, ponderomotive force) and the Maxwell equations for the divergence of the electrical field E (II) and the magnetic field B (III), La théorie electromagnétique de Maxwell et son application aux corps mouvants, 1892, p. 451. V is the velocity of light.

Early attempts to quantitatively describe the electromagnetic force were made in the mid-18th century. It was proposed that the force on magnetic poles, by Johann Tobias Mayer and others in 1760, and electrically charged objects, by Henry Cavendish in 1762, obeyed an inverse-square law. However, in both cases the experimental proof was neither complete nor conclusive. It was not until 1784 when Charles-Augustin de Coulomb, using a torsion balance, was able to definitively show through experiment that this was true. Soon after the discovery in 1820 by Hans Christian Ørsted that a magnetic needle is acted on by a voltaic current, André-Marie Ampère that same year was able to devise through experimentation the formula for the angular dependence of the force between two current elements. In all these descriptions, the force was always described in terms of the properties of the matter involved and the distances between two masses or charges rather than in terms of electric and magnetic fields.

The modern concept of electric and magnetic fields first arose in the theories of Michael Faraday, particularly his idea of lines of force, later to be given full mathematical description by Lord Kelvin and James Clerk Maxwell. From a modern perspective it is possible to identify in Maxwell's 1865 formulation of his field equations a form of the Lorentz force equation in relation to electric currents, although in the time of Maxwell it was not evident how his equations related to the forces on moving charged objects. J. J. Thomson was the first to attempt to derive from Maxwell's field equations the electromagnetic forces on a moving charged object in terms of the object's properties and external fields. Interested in determining the electromagnetic behavior of the charged particles in cathode rays, Thomson published a paper in 1881 wherein he gave the force on the particles due to an external magnetic field. However, due to some miscalculations and an incomplete description of the displacement current, Thomson included an incorrect scale-factor of one half in the formula, arriving at
$$\mathbf{F} = \frac{q}{2}\mathbf{v} \times \mathbf{B}.$$
Oliver Heaviside invented the modern vector notation and applied it to Maxwell's field equations; he also (in 1885 and 1889) had fixed the mistakes of Thomson's derivation and arrived at the correct form of the magnetic force on a moving charged object. Finally, in 1895, Hendrik Lorentz derived the modern form of the formula for the electromagnetic force which includes the contributions to the total force from both the electric and the magnetic fields. Lorentz began by abandoning the Maxwellian descriptions of the ether and conduction. Instead, Lorentz made a distinction between matter and the luminiferous aether and sought to apply the Maxwell equations at a microscopic scale. Using Heaviside's version of the Maxwell equations for a stationary ether and applying Lagrangian mechanics (see below), Lorentz arrived at the correct and complete form of the force law that now bears his name.

== Lorentz force in terms of potentials ==
The E and B fields can be replaced by the magnetic vector potential A and (scalar) electrostatic potential ϕ by
$$\begin{align}
\mathbf{E} &= - \nabla \phi - \frac { \partial \mathbf{A} } { \partial t } \\[1ex]
\mathbf{B} &= \nabla \times \mathbf{A}
\end{align}$$
where ∇ is the gradient, ∇⋅ is the divergence, and ∇× is the curl.

The force becomes
$$\mathbf{F} = q\left[-\nabla \phi- \frac{\partial \mathbf{A}}{\partial t}+\mathbf{v}\times(\nabla\times\mathbf{A})\right].$$

Using an identity for the triple product this can be rewritten as
$$\mathbf{F} = q\left[-\nabla \phi- \frac{\partial \mathbf{A}}{\partial t}+\nabla\left(\mathbf{v}\cdot \mathbf{A} \right)-\left(\mathbf{v}\cdot \nabla\right)\mathbf{A}\right].$$

(Notice that the coordinates and the velocity components should be treated as independent variables, so the del operator acts only on $\mathbf{A}$, not on $\mathbf{v}$; thus, there is no need to use Feynman's subscript notation in the equation above.) Using the chain rule, the convective derivative of $\mathbf{A}$ is:
$$\frac{\mathrm{d}\mathbf{A}}{\mathrm{d}t} = \frac{\partial\mathbf{A}}{\partial t}+(\mathbf{v}\cdot\nabla)\mathbf{A}$$
so that the above expression becomes:
$$\mathbf{F} = q\left[-\nabla (\phi-\mathbf{v}\cdot\mathbf{A})- \frac{\mathrm{d}\mathbf{A}}{\mathrm{d}t}\right].$$

With v = ẋ and
$$\frac{\mathrm{d}}{\mathrm{d}t}\left[\frac{\partial}{\partial \dot{\mathbf{x}}}\left(\phi - \dot{\mathbf{x}}\cdot \mathbf{A} \right) \right] = -\frac{\mathrm{d}\mathbf{A}}{\mathrm{d}t},$$
we can put the equation into the convenient Euler–Lagrange form

$\mathbf{F} = q\left[-\nabla_{\mathbf{x} }(\phi-\dot{\mathbf{x} }\cdot\mathbf{A}) + \frac{\mathrm{d} }{\mathrm{d}t}\nabla_{\dot{\mathbf{x} } }(\phi-\dot{\mathbf{x} }\cdot\mathbf{A})\right]$

where
$$\nabla_{\mathbf{x} } = \hat{x} \dfrac{\partial}{\partial x} + \hat{y} \dfrac{\partial}{\partial y} + \hat{z} \dfrac{\partial}{\partial z}$$
and
$$\nabla_{\dot{\mathbf{x} } } = \hat{x} \dfrac{\partial}{\partial \dot{x} } + \hat{y} \dfrac{\partial}{\partial \dot{y} } + \hat{z} \dfrac{\partial}{\partial \dot{z} }.$$

== Lorentz force and analytical mechanics ==
The Lagrangian for a charged particle of mass m and charge q in an electromagnetic field equivalently describes the dynamics of the particle in terms of its energy, rather than the force exerted on it. The classical expression is given by:
$$L = \frac{m}{2} \mathbf{\dot{r} }\cdot\mathbf{\dot{r} } + q \mathbf{A}\cdot\mathbf{\dot{r} }-q\phi$$
where A and ϕ are the potential fields as above. The quantity $V = q(\phi - \mathbf{A}\cdot \mathbf{\dot{r}})$ can be identified as a generalized, velocity-dependent potential energy and, accordingly, $\mathbf{F}$ as a non-conservative force. Using the Lagrangian, the equation for the Lorentz force given above can be obtained again.

The Hamiltonian can be derived from the Lagrangian using a Legendre transformation. The canonical momentum is
$$p_i = \frac{\partial L}{\partial \dot r_i} = m\dot{r}_i + q A_i(\mathbf r).$$
Applying the Legendre transformation gives
$$H = \dot{\mathbf r}\cdot \mathbf p - L = \frac{[\mathbf p - q\mathbf A(\mathbf r) ]^2}{2m} + q\phi.$$
This classical Hamiltonian directly generalizes to quantum mechanics, where $\mathbf p$ and $\mathbf r$ become non-commuting operators.

Derivation of Lorentz force from classical Lagrangian (SI units)

For an A field, a particle moving with velocity v = ṙ has potential momentum $q\mathbf{A}(\mathbf{r}, t)$, so its potential energy is $q\mathbf{A}(\mathbf{r},t)\cdot\mathbf{\dot{r}}$. For a ϕ field, the particle's potential energy is $q\phi(\mathbf{r},t)$.

The total potential energy is then:
$$V = q\phi - q\mathbf{A}\cdot\mathbf{\dot{r}}$$
and the kinetic energy is:
$$T = \frac{m}{2} \mathbf{\dot{r}}\cdot\mathbf{\dot{r}}$$
hence the Lagrangian:
$$\begin{align}
L &= T - V \\[1ex]
&= \frac{m}{2} \mathbf{\dot{r} } \cdot \mathbf{\dot{r} } + q \mathbf{A} \cdot \mathbf{\dot{r} } - q\phi \\[1ex]
&= \frac{m}{2} \left(\dot{x}^2 + \dot{y}^2 + \dot{z}^2\right) + q \left(\dot{x} A_x + \dot{y} A_y + \dot{z} A_z\right) - q\phi
\end{align}$$

Lagrange's equations are
$$\frac{\mathrm{d}}{\mathrm{d}t} \frac{\partial L}{\partial \dot{x}} = \frac{\partial L}{\partial x}$$
(same for y and z). So calculating the partial derivatives:
$$\begin{align}
\frac{\mathrm{d}}{\mathrm{d}t}\frac{\partial L}{\partial \dot{x} } &= m\ddot{x} + q\frac{\mathrm{d} A_x}{\mathrm{d}t} \\
& = m\ddot{x} + q \left[\frac{\partial A_x}{\partial t} + \frac{\partial A_x}{\partial x}\frac{dx}{dt} + \frac{\partial A_x}{\partial y}\frac{dy}{dt} + \frac{\partial A_x}{\partial z}\frac{dz}{dt}\right] \\[1ex]
& = m\ddot{x} + q\left[\frac{\partial A_x}{\partial t} + \frac{\partial A_x}{\partial x}\dot{x} + \frac{\partial A_x}{\partial y}\dot{y} + \frac{\partial A_x}{\partial z}\dot{z}\right]\\
\end{align}$$
$$\frac{\partial L}{\partial x}= -q\frac{\partial \phi}{\partial x}+ q\left(\frac{\partial A_x}{\partial x}\dot{x}+\frac{\partial A_y}{\partial x}\dot{y}+\frac{\partial A_z}{\partial x}\dot{z}\right)$$
equating and simplifying:
$$m\ddot{x}+ q\left(\frac{\partial A_x}{\partial t}+\frac{\partial A_x}{\partial x}\dot{x}+\frac{\partial A_x}{\partial y}\dot{y}+\frac{\partial A_x}{\partial z}\dot{z}\right)= -q\frac{\partial \phi}{\partial x}+ q\left(\frac{\partial A_x}{\partial x}\dot{x}+\frac{\partial A_y}{\partial x}\dot{y}+\frac{\partial A_z}{\partial x}\dot{z}\right)$$
$$\begin{align}
F_x & = -q\left(\frac{\partial \phi}{\partial x}+\frac{\partial A_x}{\partial t}\right) + q\left[\dot{y}\left(\frac{\partial A_y}{\partial x} - \frac{\partial A_x}{\partial y}\right)+\dot{z}\left(\frac{\partial A_z}{\partial x}-\frac{\partial A_x}{\partial z}\right)\right] \\[1ex]
& = qE_x + q[\dot{y}(\nabla\times\mathbf{A})_z-\dot{z}(\nabla\times\mathbf{A})_y] \\[1ex]
& = qE_x + q[\mathbf{\dot{r}}\times(\nabla\times\mathbf{A})]_x \\[1ex]
& = qE_x + q(\mathbf{\dot{r}}\times\mathbf{B})_x
\end{align}$$
and similarly for the y and z directions. Hence the force equation is:
$$\mathbf{F}= q(\mathbf{E} + \mathbf{\dot{r}}\times\mathbf{B})$$

The relativistic Lagrangian is
$$L = -mc^2\sqrt{1-\left(\frac{\dot{\mathbf{r} } }{c}\right)^2} + q \mathbf{A}(\mathbf{r}) \cdot \dot{\mathbf{r} } - q \phi(\mathbf{r})$$

The action is the relativistic arclength of the path of the particle in spacetime, minus the potential energy contribution, plus an extra contribution which, with quantum mechanics, can be realised as a phase obtained by a charged particle moving along a vector potential.

Derivation of Lorentz force from relativistic Lagrangian (SI units)

The equations of motion derived by extremizing the action (see matrix calculus for the notation):
$$\frac{\mathrm{d}\mathbf{P}}{\mathrm{d}t} =\frac{\partial L}{\partial \mathbf{r}} = q {\partial \mathbf{A} \over \partial \mathbf{r}}\cdot \dot{\mathbf{r}} - q {\partial \phi \over \partial \mathbf{r} }$$
$$\mathbf{P} -q\mathbf{A} = \frac{m\dot{\mathbf{r}}}{\sqrt{1-\left(\frac{\dot{\mathbf{r}}}{c}\right)^2}}$$
are the same as Hamilton's equations of motion:
$$\frac{\mathrm{d}\mathbf{r} }{\mathrm{d}t} = \frac{\partial}{\partial \mathbf{p} } \left ( \sqrt{(\mathbf{P}-q\mathbf{A})^2 + (mc^2)^2} + q\phi \right )$$
$$\frac{\mathrm{d}\mathbf{p} }{\mathrm{d}t} = -\frac{\partial}{\partial \mathbf{r}} \left ( \sqrt{(\mathbf{P}-q\mathbf{A})^2 + (mc^2)^2} + q\phi \right )$$
both are equivalent to the noncanonical form:
$$\frac{\mathrm{d} }{\mathrm{d}t} {m\dot{\mathbf{r} } \over \sqrt{1-\left(\frac{\dot{\mathbf{r} } }{c}\right)^2} } = q\left ( \mathbf{E} + \dot\mathbf{r} \times \mathbf{B} \right ) .$$
This formula is the Lorentz force, representing the rate at which the EM field adds relativistic momentum to the particle.

== Relativistic form of the Lorentz force ==
=== Covariant form of the Lorentz force ===
==== Field tensor ====
Using the metric signature (1, −1, −1, −1), the Lorentz force for a charge q can be written in covariant form:

$\frac{\mathrm{d} p^\alpha}{\mathrm{d} \tau} = q F^{\alpha \beta} U_\beta$

where p^{α} is the four-momentum, defined as
$$p^\alpha = \left(p_0, p_1, p_2, p_3 \right) = \left(\gamma m c, p_x, p_y, p_z \right) ,$$
τ the proper time of the particle, F^{αβ} the contravariant electromagnetic tensor
$$F^{\alpha \beta} = \begin{pmatrix}
0 & -E_x/c & -E_y/c & -E_z/c \\
E_x/c & 0 & -B_z & B_y \\
E_y/c & B_z & 0 & -B_x \\
E_z/c & -B_y & B_x & 0
\end{pmatrix}$$
and U is the covariant 4-velocity of the particle, defined as:
$$U_\beta = \left(U_0, U_1, U_2, U_3 \right) = \gamma \left(c, -v_x, -v_y, -v_z \right) ,$$
in which
$$\gamma(v)=\frac{1}{\sqrt{1- \frac{v^2}{c^2} } }=\frac{1}{\sqrt{1- \frac{v_x^2 + v_y^2+ v_z^2}{c^2} } }$$
is the Lorentz factor.

The fields are transformed to a frame moving with constant relative velocity by:
$$F'^{\mu \nu} = {\Lambda^{\mu} }_{\alpha} {\Lambda^{\nu} }_{\beta} F^{\alpha \beta} \, ,$$
where Λ^{μ}_{α} is the Lorentz transformation tensor.

==== Translation to vector notation ====
The α = 1 component (x-component) of the force is
$$\frac{\mathrm{d} p^1}{\mathrm{d} \tau} = q U_\beta F^{1 \beta} = q\left(U_0 F^{10} + U_1 F^{11} + U_2 F^{12} + U_3 F^{13} \right) .$$

Substituting the components of the covariant electromagnetic tensor F yields
$$\frac{\mathrm{d} p^1}{\mathrm{d} \tau} = q \left[U_0 \left(\frac{E_x}{c} \right) + U_2 (-B_z) + U_3 (B_y) \right] .$$

Using the components of covariant four-velocity yields
$$\begin{align}
\frac{\mathrm{d} p^1}{\mathrm{d} \tau}
&= q \gamma \left[c \left(\frac{E_x}{c} \right) + (-v_y) (-B_z) + (-v_z) (B_y) \right] \\[1ex]
&= q \gamma \left(E_x + v_y B_z - v_z B_y \right)
= q \gamma \left[ E_x + \left( \mathbf{v} \times \mathbf{B} \right)_x \right] \, .
\end{align}$$

The calculation for α = 2, 3 (force components in the y and z directions) yields similar results, so collecting the three equations into one:
$$\frac{\mathrm{d} \mathbf{p} }{\mathrm{d} \tau} = q \gamma\left( \mathbf{E} + \mathbf{v} \times \mathbf{B} \right) ,$$
and since differentials in coordinate time dt and proper time dτ are related by the Lorentz factor,
$$dt=\gamma(v) \, d\tau,$$
this gives,
$$\frac{\mathrm{d} \mathbf{p} }{\mathrm{d} t} = q \left( \mathbf{E} + \mathbf{v} \times \mathbf{B} \right) .$$

This is precisely the Lorentz force law, however p is the relativistic expression,
$$\mathbf{p} = \gamma(v) m_0 \mathbf{v} \,.$$

=== Lorentz force in spacetime algebra (STA) ===
The electric and magnetic fields are dependent on the velocity of an observer, so the relativistic form of the Lorentz force law can best be exhibited starting from a coordinate-independent expression for the electromagnetic and magnetic fields $\mathcal{F}$, and an arbitrary time-direction, $\gamma_0$. This can be settled through spacetime algebra (or the geometric algebra of spacetime), a type of Clifford algebra defined on a pseudo-Euclidean space, as
$$\mathbf{E} = \left(\mathcal{F} \cdot \gamma_0\right) \gamma_0$$
and
$$i\mathbf{B} = \left(\mathcal{F} \wedge \gamma_0\right) \gamma_0$$
$\mathcal F$ is a spacetime bivector (an oriented plane segment, just like a vector is an oriented line segment), which has six degrees of freedom corresponding to boosts (rotations in spacetime planes) and rotations (rotations in space-space planes). The dot product with the vector $\gamma_0$ pulls a vector (in the space algebra) from the translational part, while the wedge-product creates a trivector (in the space algebra) who is dual to a vector which is the usual magnetic field vector. The relativistic velocity is given by the (time-like) changes in a time-position vector $v = \dot x$, where
$$v^2 = 1,$$
(which shows our choice for the metric) and the velocity is
$$\mathbf{v} = cv \wedge \gamma_0 / (v \cdot \gamma_0).$$

The proper form of the Lorentz force law ('invariant' is an inadequate term because no transformation has been defined) is simply

$F = q\mathcal{F}\cdot v$

Note that the order is important because between a bivector and a vector the dot product is anti-symmetric. Upon a spacetime split like one can obtain the velocity, and fields as above yielding the usual expression.

=== Lorentz force in general relativity ===
In the general theory of relativity the equation of motion for a particle with mass $m$ and charge $e$, moving in a space with metric tensor $g_{ab}$ and electromagnetic field $F_{ab}$, is given as

$$m\frac{du_c}{ds} - m \frac{1}{2} g_{ab,c} u^a u^b = e F_{cb}u^b ,$$

where $u^a= dx^a/ds$ ($dx^a$ is taken along the trajectory), $g_{ab,c} = \partial g_{ab}/\partial x^c$, and $ds^2 = g_{ab} dx^a dx^b$.

The equation can also be written as

$$m\frac{du_c}{ds}-m\Gamma_{abc}u^a u^b = eF_{cb}u^b ,$$

where $\Gamma_{abc}$ is the Christoffel symbol (of the torsion-free metric connection in general relativity), or as

$$m\frac{Du_c}{ds} = e F_{cb}u^b ,$$

where $D$ is the covariant differential in general relativity.

== Quantum mechanics ==
In quantum mechanics, particles are described by wavefunctions whose evolution is governed by the Schrödinger equation. While this formulation does not involve forces explicitly, it extends the framework of Hamiltonian mechanics, by incorporating interactions with electromagnetic fields through potential terms in the Hamiltonian. For a non-relativistic particle of mass $m$ and charge $q$, the Hamiltonian takes the form:
$$\hat{H} = \frac{1}{2m} \left[ \hat{\mathbf{p}} - q\mathbf{A}(\mathbf{r}, t) \right]^2 + q\Phi(\mathbf{r}, t),$$
This expression is a direct generalization of the classical Hamiltonian that leads to the Lorentz force law. The key difference is that in quantum mechanics, position $\mathbf r$ and momentum $\hat\mathbf p$ are operators that do not commute. As a result, quantum dynamics incorporate fundamentally different behavior such as wave interference and quantization.

Aharonov–Bohm setup in which the magnetic field is confined to a region that the electrons do not enter. Nevertheless, the interference pattern on the screen is affected by the magnetic flux through the central region.

Unlike in classical physics, where only electric and magnetic fields influence particle motion, quantum mechanics allows the electromagnetic potentials themselves to produce observable effects. This is exemplified by the Aharonov–Bohm effect, in which a charged particle passes through a region with zero electric and magnetic fields but encircles a magnetic flux confined to an inaccessible area. Although the classical Lorentz force is zero along the particle's path, the interference pattern observed on a screen shifts depending on the enclosed magnetic flux, revealing the physical significance of the vector potential in quantum mechanics.

Nevertheless, the classical Lorentz force law emerges as an approximation to the quantum dynamics: according to the Ehrenfest theorem, the expectation value of the momentum operator evolves according to an equation that resembles the classical Lorentz force law. Even in the Aharonov–Bohm setup, the average motion of a wave packet follows the classical trajectory.

Quantum particles such as electrons also possess intrinsic spin, which introduces additional electromagnetic interactions beyond those described by the classical Lorentz force. In the non-relativistic limit, this is captured by the Pauli equation, which includes a spin–magnetic field coupling term:
$$\hat{H}_{\text{Pauli}} = \frac{1}{2m} \left[ \hat{\mathbf{p}} - q\mathbf{A} \right]^2 + q\Phi + \frac{q\hbar}{2m} \boldsymbol{\sigma} \cdot \mathbf{B},$$
where $\boldsymbol{\sigma}$ are the Pauli matrices. This term leads to spin-dependent forces absent in the classical theory. A complete relativistic treatment is given by the Dirac equation, which incorporates spin and electromagnetic interactions through minimal coupling, and correctly predicts features such as the electron's gyromagnetic ratio.

== Applications ==
In many real-world applications, the Lorentz force is insufficient to accurately describe the collective behavior of charged particles, both in practice and on a fundamental level. Real systems involve many interacting particles that also generate their own fields E and B. To account for these collective effects—such as currents, flows, and plasmas—more complex equations are required, such as the Boltzmann equation, the Fokker–Planck equation or the Navier–Stokes equations. These models go beyond single-particle dynamics, incorporating particle interactions and self-consistent field generation, and are central to fields like magnetohydrodynamics, electrohydrodynamics, and plasma physics, as well as to the understanding of astrophysical and superconducting phenomena.

The Lorentz force occurs in many devices, including:

- Cyclotrons and other circular path particle accelerators
- Ion traps
- Mass spectrometers
- Velocity filters
- Magnetrons
- Lorentz force velocimetry

In its manifestation as the Laplace force on an electric current in a conductor, this force occurs in many devices, including:

- Electric motors
- Railguns
- Linear motors
- Loudspeakers
- Magnetoplasmadynamic thrusters
- Electrical generators
- Homopolar generators
- Linear alternators

== See also ==
- Hall effect
- Gravitomagnetism
- Formulation of Maxwell's equations in special relativity
- Moving magnet and conductor problem
- Abraham–Lorentz force
- Larmor formula
- Cyclotron radiation
- Magnetoresistance
- Scalar potential
- Helmholtz decomposition
- Field line
- Coulomb's law
- Electromagnetic buoyancy
