= Electromagnetic buoyancy =

Electromagnetic effect that makes particles rise

Electromagnetic buoyancy (EMB) is a force that opposes the Lorentz force during electromagnetic phoresis of small particles or droplets in an aqueous medium. It is analogous to the ordinary effect of buoyancy observed when objects float in liquid under the influence of gravity. Though this force is still being researched, it has been clearly observed in experimental procedures.
