= Neutron-velocity selector =

A neutron-velocity selector is a device that allows neutrons of defined velocity to pass while absorbing all other neutrons, to produce a monochromatic neutron beam. It has the appearance of a many-bladed turbine. The blades are coated with a strongly neutron-absorbing material, such as Boron-10.

Neutron-velocity selectors are commonly used in neutron research facility to produce a monochromatic beam of neutrons. Due to physical limitations of materials and motors, limiting the maximum speed of rotation of the blades, these devices are only useful for relatively slow neutrons.
