= Velocity filter =

A velocity filter removes interfering signals by exploiting the difference between the travelling velocities of desired seismic waveform and undesired interfering signals.

== Introduction ==
In geophysical applications sensors are used to measure and record the seismic signals. Many filtering techniques are available in which one output waveform is produced with a higher signal-to-noise ratio than the individual sensor recordings. Velocity filters are designed to remove interfering signals by exploiting the difference between the travelling velocities of desired seismic waveform and undesired interfering signals. In contrast to the one dimensional output produced by multi-channel filtering, velocity filters produce a two-dimensional output.

Consider an array of N sensors that receive one desired and M undesired broadband interferences. Let the measurement of nth sensor be modeled by the expression:

x_{n}(t) = Σ M m = 0 a_{mn}s_{m}(t − T_{mn}) + ŋ_{n}(t)	1

where

- n = 1, 2, ..., N;
- m = 0, 1, ..., M;
- s_{m}(t) are signals travelling across the array;
- ŋ_{n}(t) represents zero-mean white random noise at the nth sensor, uncorrelated from sensor to sensor.

The parameters a_{mn} and T_{mn} are amplitude gain and time delays of the signal s_{m}(t) when received at the nth sensor.

Without loss of generality, we shall assume that s_{0}(t) is the desired signal and s_{1}(t), s_{2}(t), ..., s_{M}(t) are the undesired interferences. Additionally we shall assume that T_{0n} = 0, and a_{0n} = 1. This essentially means that the data has been time shifted to align the desired seismic signal so that it appears on all sensors at the same time and balanced so that the desired signal appears with equal amplitudes. We assume that the signals are digitized prior to being recorded and that the length K of time sequences of recorded data is large enough for the complete delayed interfering waveforms to be included in the recorded data. In the discrete frequency domain, the nth trace can be expressed as:

X_{n}(k) = S_{0}(k) + Σ M m = 1 a_{mn}S_{m}(k)e^{− jw_{k}T_{mn}} + N_{n}(k)	2

where k = 0, 1, ..., K − 1; w_{k} = (2π/K) is the sampling angular frequency.

Using matrix notation, (2) can be expressed in the form:

X(k) = A(k) S(k) + N(k)	3

$$A(k) = \begin{bmatrix} 1 & 1 & \dots & 1 \\ a_{11}e^{-jwkT_{11}} & a_{12}e^{-jwkT_{12}} & \dots & a_{1N}e^{-jwkT_{1N}} \\ \vdots & \vdots & \ddots & \vdots \\ a_{M1}e^{-jwkT_{M1}}& \dots & \dots & a_{MN}e^{-jwkT_{MN}} \end{bmatrix}$$	4

$$\begin{align} X'(k) &= [X_1(k), \dots, X_N(k)] \\ S'(k) &= [S_1(k), \dots, S_N(k)] \\ N'(k) &= [N_1(k), \dots, N_N(k)] \end{align}$$	5

== Velocity filtering ==
Frequency domain multichannel filters F_{1}(k), F_{2}(k), ..., F_{N}(k) can be applied to the data to produce one single output trace of the form:

$$Y(k) = \sum_{n \mathop =1}^{N} F_N(k)\Chi_n(k)$$	6

In matrix form, the above expression can be written as:

$$Y(k) = X'(k)F(k) = S'(k) A'(k) F(k) + N'(k) F(k)$$	7

where F(k) is an N × 1 vector whose elements are the individual channel filters. That is,

$$F(k) = [F_1(k), F_2(k), ..., F_N(k)]$$	8

By following the procedure discussed in Chen & Simaan (1990), an optimum filter vector F(k) can be designed to attenuate, in the least square sense, the undesired coherent interferences S_{1}(k), S_{2}(k), ..., S_{M}(k) while preserving the desired signal S_{0}(k) in Y(k). This filter can be shown to be of the form:

$$F(k) = \frac{\{I-[L(k)B_r(k)]^H[L(k)B_r(k)]\}h}{u'\{I-[L(k)B_r(k)]^H[L(k)B_r(k)]\} }$$	9

where h is an arbitrary N × 1 nonzero vector, u = [1,0,...,0], I is the unit matrix, B_{r}(k) is a submatrix of the matrix obtained by dropping all linearly dependent rows, and L(k) is a lower triangular matrix satisfying:

$$[L(k) B_r(k)] [L(k) B_r(k)]^H = I$$

$$A_r(k) = \begin{bmatrix} a_{11}e^{-jwkT_{11}} & \dots & a_{1N}e^{-jwkT_{1N}} \\ \vdots & \ddots & \vdots \\ a_{M1}e^{-jwkT_{M1}} & \dots & a_{MN}e^{-jwkT_{MN}} \end{bmatrix}$$	10

The multichannel processing scheme described by equations 6 to 10 produces one dimensional output trace. A velocity filter, on the other hand, is a two-dimensional filter which produces a two-dimensional output record.

A two-dimensional record can be generated by a procedure which involves repeatedly applying multichannel optimum filters to a small number of overlapping subarrays of the input data.

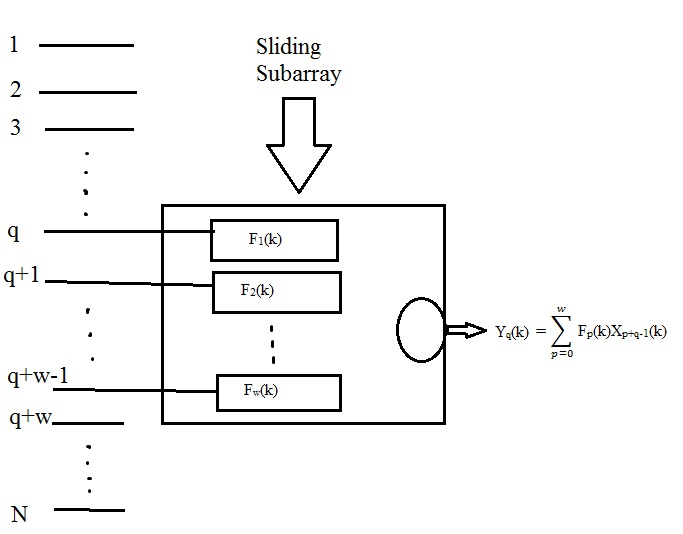
Fig. 1. A sliding subarray of multichannel filters

More specifically, consider a subarray of W channels, where W << N, which slides over the input data as shown in Fig. 1. For every subarray position an optimum multichannel filter based on (9) can be designed so that the undesired interferences are suppressed from its corresponding output trace. In designing this filter we use W instead of N in expression (9). Thus traces 1, 2, ..., W of the input record produce the first trace of the output record, traces K, K + 1, ..., K + W − 1 of the input record produce the Kth trace of the output record, and traces N − W + 1, N − W + 2, ..., N of the input record produce the (N − W + 1)st trace, which is the last trace, of the output record. For a large N and small W, as is typically the case in geophysical data, the output record can be viewed as comparable in dimensions to the input record. Clearly for such a scheme to work effectively W must be as small as possible; while at the same time it must be large enough to provide the necessary attenuation of the undesired signals. Note that a maximum of W − 1 undesired interferences can be totally suppressed by such a scheme.
